This is a list of foreign football players in the Russian Premier League.

The players had to play at least one league game to be included, the players who were signed by a Premier League club but only played in the Cup games, reserves team or in friendlies are not listed. The years listed are the calendar years the players played at least one league game in, if they didn't play in a year, that year is not listed even if they played in Cup games or for the reserves that year or played in the previous year that was the part of the same season. That includes the new signings who aren't yet registered to play.

Players who originally played for a foreign national team but later played for Russia (such as Yuri Nikiforov or Valery Kechinov) are not included.
Players who originally played for Russia but later played for a foreign team (such as Aleksei Bakharev or Vladislav Lemish) are included.

Players who hold dual citizenship (including Russian) are included, unless they played for the Russian national team (including junior levels).
The players who hold dual citizenship (none of them Russian) are listed under the country of their birth (if they have not played for any national team) or under the country they represented internationally (including junior levels). If a player represented more than one country internationally, he is listed under the country he represented last.

The players whose name is written in bold are on the 2022–23 squad lists in the league.

Afghanistan
 Sharif Mukhammad – FC Anzhi Makhachkala – 2010–2014

Albania
 Bekim Balaj – FC Akhmat Grozny, FC Nizhny Novgorod – 2016–2019, 2021
 Elvin Beqiri – FC Alania Vladikavkaz – 2005
 Enis Gavazaj – FC Yenisey Krasnoyarsk – 2018
 Ilion Lika – FC Terek Grozny – 2008
 Mario Mitaj – FC Lokomotiv Moscow – 2022–2023
 Odise Roshi – FC Terek Grozny – 2016–2020

Algeria
 Sofiane Hanni – FC Spartak Moscow – 2018–2019
 Raïs M'Bolhi – FC Krylia Sovetov Samara – 2011
 Mehdi Zeffane – FC Krylia Sovetov Samara – 2020–2021

Angola
 Bastos – FC Rostov – 2013–2016, 2021
 João Batxi – FC Krasnodar – 2022–2023
 Egas Cacintura – FC Ufa – 2021–2022
 Felício Milson – FC Pari Nizhny Novgorod – 2022
 Francisco Zuela – FC Kuban Krasnodar, FC Alania Vladikavkaz – 2009–2011

Argentina
 Oscar Ahumada – FC Rostov – 2011
 Cristian Ansaldi – FC Rubin Kazan, FC Zenit St. Petersburg – 2008–2014
 Alejandro Barbaro – FC SKA-Khabarovsk – 2017
 Antonio Barijho – FC Saturn Ramenskoye – 2004
 Pablo Barrientos – FC Moscow – 2006–2008
 Adrián Bastía – FC Saturn Ramenskoye – 2004
 Héctor Bracamonte – FC Moscow, FC Terek Grozny, FC Rostov – 2003–2012
 Fernando Cavenaghi – FC Spartak Moscow – 2004–2006
 Germán Conti – FC Lokomotiv Moscow – 2023
 Tino Costa – FC Spartak Moscow – 2013–2014
 Alejandro Domínguez – FC Rubin Kazan, FC Zenit St. Petersburg – 2004–2009
 Sebastián Driussi – FC Zenit St. Petersburg – 2017–2021
 Leandro Fernández – FC Dynamo Moscow – 2006–2014
 Osmar Ferreyra – PFC CSKA Moscow – 2004–2005
 Gabriel Florentín – FC Orenburg – 2022
 Pablo Fontanello – FC Ural Sverdlovsk Oblast – 2014–2016
 Adolfo Gaich – PFC CSKA Moscow – 2020–2022
 Ezequiel Garay – FC Zenit St. Petersburg – 2014–2016
 Walter García – FC Rubin Kazan – 2006
 Benjamín Garré – PFC Krylia Sovetov Samara – 2023
 Pablo Guiñazú – FC Saturn Ramenskoye – 2004
 Juan Manuel Insaurralde – FC Spartak Moscow – 2012–2015
 Matías Kranevitter – FC Zenit St. Petersburg – 2017–2019
 Juan Lescano – FC SKA-Khabarovsk, FC Anzhi Makhachkala – 2017–2019
 Gustavo Lillo – FC Krylia Sovetov Samara – 2002–2003
 Maxi López – FC Moscow – 2007–2008
 Cristian Maidana – FC Spartak Moscow – 2008, 2010
 Emanuel Mammana – FC Zenit St. Petersburg, PFC Sochi – 2017–2021
 Braian Mansilla – FC Orenburg – 2022–2023
 Lucas Masoero – FC Nizhny Novgorod – 2021–2023
 Patricio Matricardi – FC Rotor Volgograd – 2020
 Daniel Montenegro – FC Saturn Ramenskoye – 2004–2005
 Maximiliano Moralez – FC Moscow – 2007
 Leandro Paredes – FC Zenit St. Petersburg – 2017–2018
 Nicolás Pareja – FC Spartak Moscow – 2010–2012
 Franco Parodi – PFC Spartak Nalchik – 2009
 Nicolás Pavlovich – FC Saturn Ramenskoye – 2003–2005
 Guillermo Pereyra – FC Lokomotiv Moscow – 2008
 Matías Pérez – FC Orenburg – 2023
 Gustavo Pinto – FC Moscow – 2003–2004
 Ezequiel Ponce – FC Spartak Moscow – 2019–2021
 Lucas Pusineri – FC Saturn Ramenskoye – 2003–2004
 Federico Rasic – FC Arsenal Tula – 2017–2018
 Emiliano Rigoni – FC Zenit St. Petersburg – 2017–2020
 Clemente Rodríguez – FC Spartak Moscow – 2004–2006, 2008–2009
 Marcos Rojo – FC Spartak Moscow – 2011–2012
 Lucas Vera – FC Orenburg – 2022–2023

Armenia
 Armen Adamyan – FC Chernomorets Novorossiysk – 1995
 Robert Arzumanyan – FC Amkar Perm – 2015
 Garnik Avalyan – FC Krylia Sovetov Samara, FC Shinnik Yaroslavl, FC Uralan Elista – 1993–2000
 Khoren Bayramyan – FC Rostov, FC Rubin Kazan – 2011–2012, 2015–2023
 Roman Berezovsky – FC Zenit St. Petersburg, FC Torpedo Moscow, FC Dynamo Moscow, FC Khimki – 1996–2005, 2007–2009, 2012–2014
 Karen Dokhoyan – FC Krylia Sovetov Samara – 2000–2006
 Pavel Gorelov – FC Rostov – 2020
 Ara Hakobyan – FC Alania Vladikavkaz – 1999
 Varazdat Haroyan – FC Ural Yekaterinburg, FC Tambov – 2017–2020
 Sargis Hovhannisyan – FC Dynamo Moscow, FC Lokomotiv Moscow – 1992–1999
 Sargis Hovsepyan – FC Zenit St. Petersburg, FC Torpedo-Metallurg Moscow – 1998–2003
 Manuk Kakosyan – FC Zhemchuzhina Sochi, FC Chernomorets Novorossiysk – 1997–2001
 Aleksandr Karapetyan – PFC Sochi, FC Tambov – 2019–2020
 Vardan Khachatryan – FC Torpedo Moscow – 1993
 Barsegh Kirakosyan – FC Khimki – 2009
 Sergey Kochkanyan – FC Rostov – 2020
 Arshak Koryan – FC Lokomotiv Moscow, FC Khimki – 2017, 2020–2021
 Ruslan Koryan – FC SKA-Khabarovsk – 2017
 Yervand Krbachyan – PFC CSKA Moscow – 1993
 Armen Manucharyan – FC Rotor Volgograd – 2020
 Edgar Manucharyan – FC Ural Sverdlovsk Oblast – 2013–2017
 Karapet Mikaelyan – FC Krylia Sovetov Samara – 1999–2000
 Hrayr Mkoyan – PFC Spartak Nalchik – 2012
 Arthur Mkrtchyan – FC Torpedo Moscow, FC Krylia Sovetov Samara – 1998–1999
 Karlen Mkrtchyan – FC Anzhi Makhachkala – 2013–2016
 Andrey Movsisyan – CSKA Moscow, FC Saturn Ramenskoye, FC Moscow, Luch-Energiya Vladivostok – 1996–1997, 2000–2006
 Yura Movsisyan – FC Krasnodar, FC Spartak Moscow – 2011–2015
 Aras Özbiliz – FC Kuban Krasnodar, FC Spartak Moscow – 2012–2015
 Eduard Partsikyan – FC Zhemchuzhina Sochi – 1999
 Artur Petrosyan – FC Lokomotiv Nizhny Novgorod – 1999
 Tigran Petrosyants – FC Zhemchuzhina Sochi, PFC CSKA Moscow, FC Torpedo-Luzhniki Moscow, FC Uralan Elista, FC Krylia Sovetov Samara – 1995–2000
 Marcos Pizzelli – FC Kuban Krasnodar, FC Krasnodar – 2012–2013
 Artur Sarkisov – FC Volga Nizhny Novgorod, FC Ural Sverdlovsk Oblast, FC Yenisey Krasnoyarsk – 2012–2014, 2018–2019
 Albert Sarkisyan – FC Lokomotiv Moscow, FC Torpedo Moscow, FC Alania Vladikavkaz, FC Amkar Perm – 1997–2006
 Armen Shahgeldyan – FC Dynamo Moscow – 2000
 Artyom Simonyan – FC Torpedo Moscow – 2022
 Eduard Spertsyan – FC Krasnodar – 2020–2023
 Nair Tiknizyan – PFC CSKA Moscow, FC Lokomotiv Moscow – 2019–2023
 Erik Vardanyan – PFC Sochi – 2020
 Artur Voskanyan – FC Uralan Elista – 1999–2000
 Yeghia Yavruyan – FC Shinnik Yaroslavl – 2006
 Aramais Yepiskoposyan – FC Chernomorets Novorossiysk – 1995–1997
 David Yurchenko – Krylia Sovetov, Mordovia Saransk, FC Ufa, FC Anzhi Makhachkala, FC Tosno, FC Yenisey Krasnoyarsk – 2010, 2012–13, 2014–19
 Robert Zebelyan – FC Kuban Krasnodar, FC Khimki – 2007

Australia
 Ivan Franjic – FC Torpedo Moscow – 2014–2015
 Luke Wilkshire – FC Dynamo Moscow, FC Terek Grozny – 2008–2014, 2016

Austria
 Moritz Bauer – FC Rubin Kazan, FC Ufa – 2016–2017, 2021
 Markus Berger – FC Ural Sverdlovsk Oblast – 2014
 Darko Bodul – FC Amkar Perm, FC Yenisey Krasnoyarsk – 2016–2018
 Jakob Jantscher – FC Dynamo Moscow – 2012–2013
 Emanuel Pogatetz – FC Spartak Moscow – 2005
 Martin Stranzl – FC Spartak Moscow – 2006–2010

Azerbaijan
 Ilgar Abdurahmanov – FC Anzhi Makhachkala – 2001
 Ruslan Abishov – FC Rubin Kazan – 2013
 Emin Ağayev – FC Torpedo-ZIL Moscow – 2001
 Tarlan Ahmadov – FC Fakel Voronezh – 2000
 Azer Aliyev – PFC Krylia Sovetov Samara, FC Ufa, FC Tambov – 2018–2021
 Kamran Aliyev – FC Khimki – 2020
 Arif Asadov – FC Spartak Vladikavkaz, FC Tyumen – 1994, 1998
 Deni Gaisumov – PFC CSKA Moscow, FC Terek Grozny – 1995, 1997, 2005
 Vali Gasimov – FC Spartak Moscow, FC Dynamo Moscow – 1992
 Elbeyi Guliyev – FC Ural Sverdlovsk Oblast – 2016 
 Gurban Gurbanov – FC Fakel Voronezh – 2000–2001
 Ruslan İdiqov – FC KamAZ-Chally Naberezhnye Chelny – 1995
 Vagif Javadov – FC Volga Nizhny Novgorod – 2011
 Dmitry Kramarenko – FC Dynamo Moscow, FC Torpedo Moscow, FC Alania Vladikavkaz, PFC CSKA Moscow – 1993–2002
 Magomed Kurbanov – FC Rostov – 2012
 Vladislav Lemish – FC Kuban Krasnodar, PFC CSKA Moscow, FC Baltika Kaliningrad – 1992, 1994, 1997
 Vyacheslav Lychkin – FC Dynamo Stavropol, FC Tyumen – 1992, 1998
 Emin Mahmudov – FC Saturn Ramenskoye, FC Spartak Moscow, FC Tom Tomsk, PFC Krylia Sovetov Samara, FC Mordovia Saransk – 2010–2016
 Lev Mayorov – FC Chernomorets Novorossiysk – 1995–2001, 2003
 Filip Ozobić – FC Spartak Moscow – 2010–2011
 Kazemır Qudiyev – FC Zhemchuzhina Sochi – 1996–1997
 Emin Quliyev – FC Spartak-Alania Vladikavkaz – 2003
 Ramil Sheydayev – FC Zenit Saint Petersburg, FC Rubin Kazan, FC Krylia Sovetov Samara, FC Dynamo Moscow – 2014–2015, 2018–2019
 Mahir Shukurov – FC Anzhi Makhachkala – 2010
 Narvik Sırxayev – FC Anzhi Makhachkala, FC Lokomotiv Moscow, FC Moscow, FC Terek Grozny – 2000–2005
 Branimir Subašić – FC Amkar Perm – 2005
 Nazim Suleymanov – FC Alania Vladikavkaz, FC Zhemchuzhina Sochi – 1992–1998
 Aleksandr Zhidkov – FC Anzhi Makhachkala – 2000–2001

Belarus
 Yury Afanasenko – FC Alania Vladikavkaz – 1998
 Mikhail Afanasyev – FC Amkar Perm – 2008–2009
 Dzmitry Aharodnik – FC Zenit St. Petersburg – 2000–2002
 Anton Amelchenko – FC Moscow, FC Rostov, FC Terek Grozny – 2007–2010, 2012–2014
 Syarhey Amelyanchuk – FC Lokomotiv Moscow, FC Shinnik Yaroslavl, FC Rostov, FC Terek Grozny, FC Tom Tomsk  – 2005–2013
 Yury Antanovich – PFC CSKA Moscow, FC Rostselmash Rostov-on-Don – 1993–1998
 Andrey Astrowski – FC Dynamo Moscow, FC Moscow – 1997–2000, 2004
 Syarhey Balanovich – FC Amkar Perm – 2014–2018
 Eduard Baltrushevich – FC Fakel Voronezh – 2001
 Alyaksandr Baranaw – FC Rostselmash Rostov-on-Don, FC Lokomotiv Nizhny Novgorod – 2000
 Vasili Baranov – FC Baltika Kaliningrad, FC Spartak Moscow, FC Spartak-Alania Vladikavkaz – 1996–2003
 Dzmitry Barazna – FC KamAZ-Chally Naberezhnye Chelny – 1997
 Igor Belov – FC Luch Vladivostok – 1993
 Gennadi Bliznyuk – FC Sibir Novosibirsk – 2010
 Maksim Bordachyov – FC Tom Tomsk, FC Rostov, FC Orenburg – 2013–2017
 Renan Bressan – FC Alania Vladikavkaz – 2013
 Vital Bulyga – FC Krylia Sovetov Samara, FC Uralan Elista, FC Amkar Perm, FC Tom Tomsk, FC Luch-Energiya Vladivostok – 2002–2008
 Dzmitry Chaley – FC Rostselmash Rostov-on-Don – 2002
 Alyaksandr Chayka – FC Alania Vladikavkaz, FC Krylia Sovetov Samara, FC Rostselmash Rostov-on-Don – 1998–2002
 Artyom Chelyadinsky – FC Sokol Saratov – 2002
 Ilya Chernyak – FC Akhmat Grozny – 2023
 Anton Chichkan – FC Ufa – 2022
 Alyaksandr Chysty – FC Lokomotiv Nizhny Novgorod, FC Amkar Perm – 1996–1997, 2004
 Andrey Chukhley – FC Ural Sverdlovsk Oblast – 2013
 Ruslan Danilyuk – FC Dynamo-Gazovik Tyumen – 1995
 Stanislaw Drahun – FC Krylia Sovetov Samara, FC Dynamo Moscow, FC Orenburg – 2013–2017
 Yegor Filipenko – FC Spartak Moscow, FC Tom Tomsk, FC Sibir Novosibirsk, FC Ural Yekaterinburg – 2008–2010, 2022–2023
 Vyacheslav Geraschenko – FC Chernomorets Novorossiysk, PFC CSKA Moscow, FC Uralan Elista – 1995–2000, 2002
 Dmitry German – FC Tambov – 2021
 Artem Gomelko – FC Lokomotiv Moscow – 2011
 Boris Gorovoy – FC Zenit St. Petersburg, FC Torpedo-Metallurg Moscow – 1999–2003
 Valery Gromyko – FC Arsenal Tula – 2020–2021
 Sergei Gurenko – FC Lokomotiv Moscow – 1995–1999, 2003–2008
 Syarhey Herasimets – FC Baltika Kaliningrad, FC Zenit St. Petersburg – 1997–1999
 Alexander Hleb – FC Krylia Sovetov Samara – 2012, 2017
 Alyaksandr Hrapkowski – FC Sokol Saratov – 2002
 Alyaksandr Hutar – FC Orenburg – 2016
 Pyotr Kachura – FC Sokol Saratov – 2002
 Timofey Kalachyov – FC Rostov, FC Krylia Sovetov Samara – 2006–2019
 Dzmitry Kamarowski – FC Torpedo Moscow – 2005
 Kirill Kaplenko – FC Zenit St. Petersburg, FC Orenburg – 2017, 2020, 2022–2023 (received Russian citizenship in 2018, switched international allegiance back to Belarus in 2022)
 Alyaksandr Karnitsky – FC Tosno – 2017–2018
 Uladzimir Karytska – FC Rostselmash Rostov-on-Don, FC Saturn-RenTV Ramenskoye, FC Torpedo-Metallurg Moscow, FC Alania Vladikavkaz, FC Terek Grozny, FC Arsenal Tula – 2002–2005, 2015
 Yury Kavalyow – FC Arsenal Tula, FC Orenburg – 2020–2023
 Yury Khadaronak – FC Luch Vladivostok – 1993
 Vasil Khamutowski – FC Dynamo Moscow, FC Tom Tomsk, FC Amkar Perm – 2001, 2006–2007, 2011
 Andrey Khlebasolaw – FC Krylia Sovetov Samara – 1995
 Syarhey Kislyak – FC Rubin Kazan, FC Krasnodar – 2011–2016
 Andrey Klimovich – FC Orenburg – 2019–2020
 Volodymyr Konovalov – FC Spartak Vladikavkaz – 1993
 Artem Kontsevoy – FC Spartak Moscow, PFC Spartak Nalchik – 2003, 2009
 Sergei Kornilenko – FC Tom Tomsk, FC Zenit St. Petersburg, FC Krylia Sovetov Samara – 2008–2019
 Andrei Kovalenko – FC Kuban Krasnodar, FC Rotor Volgograd, FC Rostselmash Rostov-on-Don, FC Fakel Voronezh – 1992–1993, 1996–1998, 2000
 Konstantin Kovalenko – FC Spartak Moscow, FC Zhemchuzhina Sochi, FC Alania Vladikavkaz, FC Chernomorets Novorossiysk, FC Saturn-RenTV Ramenskoye – 1996–2000, 2002
 Igor Kovalevich – FC Dynamo-Gazovik Tyumen – 1994–1995
 Leonid Kovel – FC Saturn Ramenskoye – 2008–2010
 Dzyanis Kowba – FC Krylia Sovetov Samara – 2000–2011
 Aliaksei Kuchuk – FC Kuban Krasnodar – 2009
 Alyaksandr Kulchy – FC Dynamo Moscow, FC Shinnik Yaroslavl, FC Tom Tomsk, FC Rostov, FC Krasnodar – 1997–1999, 2002–2007, 2009–2012
 Syarhey Lagutko – FC Krylia Sovetov Samara – 1996
 Leanid Lahun – FC Torpedo Moscow – 2001–2002
 Vital Lanko – FC Fakel Voronezh, PFC Spartak Nalchik, FC Luch-Energiya Vladivostok – 2001, 2006–2008
 Denis Laptev – FC Torpedo Moscow – 2022
 Andrei Lavrik – FC Lokomotiv Moscow, FC Amkar Perm – 1998–2001, 2004–2007
 Alyaksandr Lebedzew – FC Kuban Krasnodar – 2007
 Dmitry Lentsevich – FC Torpedo Moscow – 2006
 Vitaly Lisakovich – FC Lokomotiv Moscow, FC Rubin Kazan – 2020–2022
 Alyaksandar Lukhvich – FC KAMAZ-Chally Naberezhnye Chelny, FC Uralan Elista, FC Torpedo Moscow – 1997–2004
 Mikhail Markhel – FC Spartak Vladikavkaz, FC Torpedo Moscow, FC Chernomorets Novorossiysk – 1993–1996
 Yuri Markhel – FC Alania Vladikavkaz – 2001
 Alyaksandr Martynovich – FC Krasnodar, FC Ural Sverdlovsk Oblast – 2011–2022
 Aleksandr Martyoshkin – FC Krylia Sovetov Samara, FC KAMAZ-Chally Naberezhnye Chelny – 1994–1995, 1997
 Ivan Mayewski – FC Anzhi Makhachkala, FC Rotor Volgograd – 2015–2016, 2021
 Alyaksandr Mazhavoy – FC Spartak Vladikavkaz – 1993
 Vladimir Medved – FC Rotor Volgograd – 2021
 Uladzimir Mihurski – FC Lokomotiv Nizhny Novgorod – 1992
 Dmitry Molosh – FC Sibir Novosibirsk, FC Krylia Sovetov Samara – 2010–2012
 Pavel Nyakhaychyk – FC Dynamo Moscow, FC Tom Tomsk, FC Orenburg – 2011–2012, 2014, 2016–2017
 Alyaksandr Oreshnikow – FC Krylia Sovetov Samara, FC Lokomotiv Nizhny Novgorod – 1995–1998, 2000
 Radislav Orlovsky – FC Torpedo Moscow, FC Fakel Voronezh – 1997–2001
 Ihar Patapaw – FC Chernomorets Novorossiysk – 1996
 Aleksandr Pavlovets – FC Rostov, FC Orenburg – 2020–2022
 Kiril Pavlyuchek – FC Luch-Energiya Vladivostok – 2008
 Denis Polyakov – FC Ural Yekaterinburg – 2019–2020
 Anton Putsila – FC Volga Nizhny Novgorod, FC Torpedo Moscow – 2013–2015
 Kiryl Pyachenin – FC Orenburg – 2022
 Syarhey Pyatrukovich – FC Dynamo-Gazovik Tyumen – 1994
 Pavel Radnyonak – FC Dynamo-Gazovik Tyumen – 1994
 Artsyom Radzkow – FC Khimki, FC Terek Grozny – 2008, 2013
 Andrei Rapeika – FC Lokomotiv Nizhny Novgorod – 1996–1997
 Dzmitry Rawneyka – FC Torpedo Moscow, FC Rotor Volgograd – 2003–2004
 Maksim Romaschenko – FC Dynamo Moscow, FC Khimki – 1997–2000, 2004–2006, 2009
 Miroslav Romaschenko – FC Uralmash Yekaterinburg, FC Spartak Moscow – 1994–1998
 Mikalay Ryndzyuk – FC Lokomotiv Moscow, FC Lokomotiv Nizhny Novgorod – 1998–2000
 Andrei Satsunkevich – FC Lokomotiv Nizhny Novgorod – 1995–1997
 Aleksandr Sednyov – FC Chernomorets Novorossiysk, FC Baltika Kaliningrad – 1995, 1998
 Aleksandr Selyava – FC Rostov – 2022–2023
 Valeri Shantalosau – FC Lokomotiv Nizhny Novgorod, FC Baltika Kaliningrad, FC Torpedo Moscow – 1992–2000
 Igor Shitov – FC Dynamo Moscow, FC Mordovia Saransk – 2011–2016
 Aleh Shkabara – FC Dynamo Moscow – 2002, 2005
 Ilya Shkurin – PFC CSKA Moscow – 2020–2021
 Syarhey Shtanyuk – FC Dynamo Moscow, FC Shinnik Yaroslavl, FC Luch-Energiya Vladivostok – 1996–2000, 2003–2007
 Yuri Shukanov – FC Baltika Kaliningrad, FC KamAZ-Chally Naberezhnye Chelny, FC Uralan Elista, FC Fakel Voronezh – 1996–2001
 Uladzimir Shuneyka – FC Krylia Sovetov Samara, FC Spartak-Alania Vladikavkaz – 2000–2003
 Mikalay Signevich – FC Khimki – 2020
 Mikhail Sivakow – FC Orenburg, FC Amkar Perm – 2017–2020, 2022–2023
 Vadim Skripchenko – PFC CSKA Moscow – 2000
 Aleksey Skvernyuk – FC Krylia Sovetov Samara, FC Kuban Krasnodar, PFC Spartak Nalchik – 2005–2009, 2011–2012
 Mikhail Smirnov – FC Torpedo Moscow – 1993
 Andrei Sosnitskiy – FC Spartak Vladikavkaz, FC Uralmash Yekaterinburg, FC Chernomorets Novorossiysk – 1992–1996
 Sergey Sosnovski – FC Tom Tomsk – 2011–2012
 Alyaksey Suchkow – FC Shinnik Yaroslavl – 2004
 Rodion Syamuk – FC Tambov – 2021
 Andrey Syarohin – FC Tyumen – 1997
 Ihar Tarlowski – FC Alania Vladikavkaz – 1998–2004
 Ihar Tsaplyuk – FC KamAZ Naberezhnye Chelny – 1993
 Yan Tsiharaw – FC Tom Tomsk, FC Lokomotiv Moscow – 2011–2015
 Gennady Tumilovich – FC Zhemchuzhina Sochi, FC Dynamo Moscow, FC Rostselmash Rostov-on-Don – 1998–2002
 Vital Valadzyankow – FC Sokol Saratov – 2002
 Maksim Valadzko – FC Arsenal Tula, FC Tambov – 2019–2020
 Raman Vasilyuk – FC Spartak Moscow – 2001–2003
 Sergey Vekhtev – FC Baltika Kaliningrad – 1997
 Sergey Veremko – FC Krylia Sovetov Samara, FC Ufa – 2011–2014
 Dzmitry Verkhawtsow – FC Krylia Sovetov Samara, FC Ufa – 2012–2015
 Andrei Viktorovich – FC Luch Vladivostok – 1993
 Zakhar Volkov – FC Khimki – 2022
 Uladzimir Vostrykaw – FC Chernomorets Novorossiysk – 1997
 Valery Vyalichka – FC Spartak Moscow, FC Lokomotiv Nizhny Novgorod – 1995–1996
 Alyaksandr Vyazhevich – FC Chernomorets Novorossiysk – 1997
 Erik Yakhimovich – FC Dynamo Moscow – 1994–2000
 Syarhey Yaskovich – FC Anzhi Makhachkala, FC Moscow, FC Tom Tomsk – 2000–2001, 2004–2005
 Vladimir Yurchenko – FC Saturn Ramenskoye – 2008–2009
 Roman Yuzepchuk – FC Torpedo Moscow – 2023
 Maksim Zhavnerchik – FC Kuban Krasnodar – 2009, 2011–2014
 Yuri Zhevnov – FC Moscow, FC Zenit St. Petersburg, FC Torpedo Moscow, FC Ural Sverdlovsk Oblast – 2005–2015
 Uladzimir Zhuravel – FC Zhemchuzhina Sochi – 1998–1999
 Kirill Zinovich – FC Lokomotiv Moscow – 2021
 Nikolay Zolotov – FC Ural Yekaterinburg – 2020

Belgium
 Gianni Bruno – FC Krylia Sovetov Samara – 2016–2017
 Maximiliano Caufriez – FC Spartak Moscow – 2021–2022
 Danilo – FC Mordovia Saransk – 2014–2015
 Jonathan Legear – FC Terek Grozny – 2011–2013
 Maxime Lestienne – FC Rubin Kazan – 2016–2017
 Nicolas Lombaerts – FC Zenit St. Petersburg – 2007–2017
 Cédric Roussel – FC Rubin Kazan – 2004
 Jeroen Simaeys – FC Krylia Sovetov Samara – 2015–2016
 Axel Witsel – FC Zenit St. Petersburg – 2012–2016

Bolivia
 Juan Carlos Arce – FC Terek Grozny – 2010

Bosnia and Herzegovina
 Mersudin Ahmetović – FC Rostov, FC Volga Nizhny Novgorod – 2009–2012
 Ricardo Baiano – FC Kuban Krasnodar, PFC Spartak Nalchik, FC Moscow – 2004, 2007–2009
 Ivan Bašić – FC Orenburg – 2022–2023
 Džemal Berberović – FC Kuban Krasnodar – 2007
 Dragan Blatnjak – FC Khimki, FC Rostov – 2007–2012
 Dario Damjanović – FC Luch-Energiya Vladivostok – 2008
 Goran Drmić – FC Krylia Sovetov Samara – 2010
 Samir Duro – FC Saturn-RenTV Ramenskoye – 2003
 Nenad Gagro – FC Saturn-RenTV Ramenskoye – 2002
 Renato Gojković – FC Orenburg – 2022–2023
 Vladan Grujić – FC Alania Vladikavkaz – 2005
 Dennis Hadžikadunić – FC Rostov – 2018–2021
 Amir Hamzić – FC Anzhi Makhachkala – 2002
 Haris Handžić – FC Ufa – 2014–2016
 Dženan Hošić – FC Anzhi Makhachkala – 2000–2002
 Senijad Ibričić – FC Lokomotiv Moscow – 2011–2012
 Petar Jelić – FC Volga Nizhny Novgorod – 2012
 Omer Joldić – FC Saturn Ramenskoye – 2001–2002
 Mario Jurić – FC Shinnik Yaroslavl, PFC Spartak Nalchik – 2004–2006
 Miro Katić – FC Torpedo-Metallurg Moscow – 2003
 Zehrudin Kavazović – FC Anzhi Makhachkala – 2001
 Branislav Krunić – FC Tom Tomsk, FC Moscow – 2005–2009
 Edis Kurtić – FC Torpedo-ZIL Moscow – 2001
 Josip Lukačević – FC Luch-Energiya Vladivostok – 2008
 Ajdin Maksumić – FC Khimki – 2007
 Darko Maletić – FC Zenit St. Petersburg, FC Shinnik Yaroslavl – 2004–2005
 Zvjezdan Misimović – FC Dynamo Moscow – 2011–2012
 Amel Mujčinović – FC Anzhi Makhachkala – 2002
 Samir Muratović – FC Saturn Ramenskoye – 2001–2003
 Srđan Pecelj – FC Sokol Saratov – 2001
 Elvir Rahimić – FC Anzhi Makhachkala, PFC CSKA Moscow – 2000–2013
 Amar Rahmanović – PFC Krylia Sovetov Samara – 2022–2023
 Senad Repuh – FC Sokol Saratov – 2001–2002
 Munever Rizvić – FC Moscow – 2001–2004
 Miloš Šatara – FC Akhmat Grozny – 2023
 Igor Savić – FC Torpedo Moscow – 2022–2023
 Kabir Smajić – FC Saturn Ramenskoye – 2001
 Emir Spahić – FC Shinnik Yaroslavl, FC Torpedo Moscow, FC Lokomotiv Moscow, FC Anzhi Makhachkala – 2004–2008, 2013
 Dragan Stojkić – FC Luch-Energiya Vladivostok – 2008
 Toni Šunjić – FC Kuban Krasnodar, FC Dynamo Moscow – 2014–2015, 2017–2020
 Darko Todorović – FC Akhmat Grozny – 2021–2022
 Marko Topić – FC Krylia Sovetov Samara, FC Saturn Moscow Oblast – 2005–2010
 Vule Trivunović – FC Khimki – 2007–2009
 Ognjen Vranješ – FC Krasnodar, FC Alania Vladikavkaz, FC Tom Tomsk – 2011–2013, 2016
 Aleksandar Vrhovac – FC Krylia Sovetov Samara – 1999–2000
 Adnan Zahirović – PFC Spartak Nalchik – 2011–2012
 Hadis Zubanović – FC Anzhi Makhachkala – 2002

Brazil
 Adílson – FC Terek Grozny – 2012–2016
 Luiz Adriano – FC Spartak Moscow – 2017–2019
 Aílton – FC Terek Grozny – 2012–2015
 Alberto – FC Dynamo Moscow – 2003–2004
 Carlos Alberto – FC Torpedo-Luzhniki Moscow – 1997
 Alex – FC Spartak Moscow – 2009–2011
 Aloísio – FC Rubin Kazan – 2003–2004
 Yuri Alberto – FC Zenit St. Petersburg – 2022
 Alex Alves – FC Saturn Ramenskoye – 2004
 André Alves – FC Luch-Energiya Vladivostok – 2008
 Léo Andrade – FC Khimki – 2023
 Ângelo – FC Krylia Sovetov Samara, FC Alania Vladikavkaz – 2001–2002
 Apodi – FC Kuban Krasnodar – 2016
 Ari – FC Spartak Moscow, FC Krasnodar, FC Lokomotiv Moscow – 2010–2018 (received Russian citizenship in 2018, called up to the Russia national team)
 Fábio Augusto – FC Chernomorets Novorossiysk – 2003
 Gabriel Atz – FC Rubin Kazan, FC Khimki – 2006–2008
 Baiano – FC Rubin Kazan – 2006
 Helio Batista – FC Alania Vladikavkaz – 1999
 Rodrigo Becão – PFC CSKA Moscow – 2018–2019
 William Boaventura – FC Kuban Krasnodar – 2009
 Pedro Botelho – FC Krylia Sovetov Samara – 2007
 Ricardo Bóvio – FC Chernomorets Novorossiysk – 2003
 Brener – FC Uralan Elista – 2000
 Calisto – FC Rubin Kazan – 2003–2007
 Rafael Carioca – FC Spartak Moscow – 2009, 2011–2014
 Diego Carlos – FC Ufa – 2014–2016
 Jean Carlos – FC Amkar Perm – 2009–2010
 Carlos Eduardo – FC Rubin Kazan – 2010, 2012, 2014–2016
 Carlos Roberto – FC Rostov – 2003
 Cardoso – FC Alania Vladikavkaz – 2012
 Anderson Carvalho – FC Tosno – 2017
 Daniel Carvalho – PFC CSKA Moscow – 2004–2009
 Cassiano – FC Uralan Elista – 2000
 Celsinho – FC Lokomotiv Moscow – 2006
 Júlio César – FC Lokomotiv Moscow – 2002–2003
 Charles – FC Lokomotiv Moscow – 2008–2010
 Claudinho – FC Zenit St. Petersburg – 2021–2023 (received Russian citizenship in 2023)
 Cléber – FC Terek Grozny – 2009
 Fábio Costa – FC Chernomorets Novorossiysk – 2003
 Fernando Costanza – PFC Krylia Sovetov Samara – 2022–2023
 Da Silva – FC Saturn-RenTV Ramenskoye – 2003
 Da Silva – FC Lokomotiv Nizhny Novgorod – 1995
 Danielson – FC Khimki – 2008
 Danilo – FC Kuban Krasnodar – 2014
 Derlei – FC Dynamo Moscow – 2005–2006
 André Dias – FC Spartak Moscow – 2003
 Dudu – PFC CSKA Moscow – 2005–2008
 Edu – FC Alania Vladikavkaz, FC Krylia Sovetov Samara, FC Anzhi Makhachkala – 1998–2001
 Élson – FC Rostov – 2011–2012
 Paulo Emilio – FC Alania Vladikavkaz – 1998–2002
 Ewerton – FC Anzhi Makhachkala – 2012–2014
 Ewerthon – FC Terek Grozny – 2011
 Lucas Fasson – FC Lokomotiv Moscow – 2022
 Felipe – PFC Spartak Nalchik – 2008–2009
 Mário Fernandes – PFC CSKA Moscow – 2012–2016 (received Russian citizenship in 2016, called up to the Russia national team)
 Fernando – FC Spartak Moscow – 2016–2019
 Antonio Ferreira – PFC Spartak Nalchik, FC Terek Grozny – 2009–2014
 Fininho – FC Lokomotiv Moscow – 2006–2009
 Flamarion – FC Rotor Volgograd – 2020–2021
 Flávio – FC Chernomorets Novorossiysk – 2003
 Bruno Fuchs – PFC CSKA Moscow – 2020–2022
 Gaúcho – FC Krylia Sovetov Samara – 2002–2003
 Éder Gaúcho – FC Terek Grozny – 2005
 Géder – FC Saturn Ramenskoye, FC Spartak Moscow – 2003–2007
 Gelson – FC Shinnik Yaroslavl – 2004
 Giuliano – FC Zenit St. Petersburg – 2016–2017
 Guilherme – PFC CSKA Moscow – 2009–2010
 Marcos Guilherme – FC Khimki – 2023
 Hernani – FC Zenit St. Petersburg – 2017–2019
 Hulk – FC Zenit St. Petersburg – 2012–2016
 Ibson – FC Spartak Moscow – 2009–2011
 Ilson – FC Shinnik Yaroslavl – 2004
 Isael – FC Krasnodar – 2013–2014
 Ismael – FC Akhmat Grozny – 2017–2021
 Léo Jabá – FC Akhmat Grozny – 2017–2018
 Jaílson – FC Rubin Kazan – 2007
 Jajá – FC Torpedo Moscow – 2023
 Jean – FC Saturn Ramenskoye, FC Dynamo Moscow, FC Rubin Kazan – 2004–2007
 Jean – FC Saturn Ramenskoye – 2005–2006
 Jefferson – FC Alania Vladikavkaz, FC Uralan Elista – 1999–2000
 Jefthon – FC Kuban Krasnodar, PFC Spartak Nalchik, FC Rubin Kazan – 2004, 2006–2008
 Ricardo Jesus – PFC Spartak Nalchik, PFC CSKA Moscow – 2007–2010
 Jô – PFC CSKA Moscow – 2006–2008
 João Carlos – FC Anzhi Makhachkala, FC Spartak Moscow – 2011–2015
 Joãozinho – FC Krasnodar, FC Dynamo Moscow, PFC Sochi – 2011–2023 (received Russian citizenship in 2016)
 Jonathas – FC Rubin Kazan – 2016–2017
 Jorginho – FC Krylia Sovetov Samara – 1999
 Junior – FC Lokomotiv Nizhny Novgorod – 1995–1996
 Jucilei – FC Anzhi Makhachkala – 2011–2013
 Kady – FC Krasnodar – 2023
 Kaio – FC Krasnodar – 2019–2023
 Kanu – FC Terek Grozny – 2013–2016
 Pedro Ken – FC Terek Grozny – 2016
 Leandro – FC Lokomotiv Moscow – 2003–2004
 Leandro – FC Saturn Ramenskoye – 2004
 Leandro da Silva – FC Luch-Energiya Vladivostok, PFC Spartak Nalchik, FC Kuban Krasnodar, FC Volga Nizhny Novgorod – 2008–2011, 2013–2014
 Leilton – FC Krylia Sovetov Samara, FC Shinnik Yaroslavl, FC Volga Nizhny Novgorod – 2003–2011
 Leonardo – FC Anzhi Makhachkala – 2015
 Leonidas – PFC CSKA Moscow, FC Torpedo-Luzhniki Moscow – 1996–1997
 Francisco Lima – FC Lokomotiv Moscow, FC Dynamo Moscow – 2004–2006
 David Lopes – FC Terek Grozny – 2008
 Róbson Lopes – FC Chernomorets Novorossiysk – 2003
 Vágner Love – PFC CSKA Moscow – 2004–2011, 2013
 Ayrton Lucas – FC Spartak Moscow – 2019–2022
 Jorge Luís – FC Dynamo Moscow – 2006
 Luizão – FC Spartak Moscow – 2003
 Maicon – FC Lokomotiv Moscow – 2010–2017
 Malcom – FC Zenit St. Petersburg – 2019–2023  (received Russian citizenship in 2023)
 Gustavo Mantuan – FC Zenit St. Petersburg – 2022–2023
 Marcão – FC Spartak Moscow – 2000–2001
 Marcelo Silva – FC Spartak Moscow – 2002
 Marcinho – FC Ufa – 2014–2016
 Marcos – FC KamAZ-Chally Naberezhnye Chelny – 1997
 Maurício – FC Spartak Moscow – 2016–2017
 Maurício – FC Terek Grozny, FC Zenit St. Petersburg – 2010–2017
 Diego Maurício – FC Alania Vladikavkaz – 2012
 Murilo – FC Lokomotiv Moscow – 2019–2021
 Mendes – FC Zhemchuzhina Sochi – 1998
 Milá – FC Uralan Elista – 2000
 Moisés – FC Spartak Moscow, FC Krylia Sovetov Samara – 2002–2004
 Moisés – PFC CSKA Moscow – 2022–2023
 Mozart – FC Spartak Moscow – 2005–2008
 Nadson – FC Krylia Sovetov Samara – 2013, 2015–2018
 Naldo – FC Krasnodar – 2016–2017
 Danilo Neco – FC Alania Vladikavkaz – 2012–2013
 Pablo – FC Rubin Kazan – 2020
 Pablo – FC Lokomotiv Moscow – 2021
 Pedrinho – FC Lokomotiv Moscow – 2022
 Peniche – FC Spartak Moscow – 1999
 Ramón – PFC CSKA Moscow, FC Krylia Sovetov Samara – 2007–2009
 Eduardo Ratinho – PFC CSKA Moscow – 2007
 Ravanelli – FC Akhmat Grozny – 2017–2020
 Régis – FC Saturn-RenTV Ramenskoye – 2003
 Robert Renan – FC Zenit Saint Petersburg – 2023
 Ricardinho – FC Tosno – 2018
 Robert – FC Spartak Moscow – 2003
 Roberto Carlos – FC Anzhi Makhachkala – 2011
 Luis Robson – FC Spartak Moscow – 1997–2001
 Pedro Rocha – FC Spartak Moscow – 2017–2018
 Rodolfo – FC Lokomotiv Moscow, FC Terek Grozny – 2007–2010, 2015–2019
 Rodrigão – PFC Sochi, FC Zenit Saint Petersburg – 2021–2023
 Rômulo – FC Spartak Moscow – 2012, 2014–2016
 Rôni – FC Rubin Kazan, FC Krylia Sovetov Samara – 2003–2005
 Rudnei – FC Alania Vladikavkaz – 2012–2013
 Russo – FC Spartak Moscow – 2003
 Leandro Samarone – PFC CSKA Moscow, FC Torpedo-Luzhniki Moscow, FC Spartak Moscow, FC Krylia Sovetov Samara, FC Rubin Kazan – 1996–1998, 2000–2003
 Philipe Sampaio – FC Akhmat Grozny – 2017
 Felipe Santana – FC Kuban Krasnodar – 2016
 Douglas Santos – FC Zenit Saint Petersburg – 2019–2023
 Lucas Santos – PFC CSKA Moscow – 2019
 Rafael Schmitz – FC Krylia Sovetov Samara – 2004
 Souza – FC Krylia Sovetov Samara – 2003–2005
 Diego Tardelli – FC Anzhi Makhachkala – 2011
 Bruno Teles – FC Krylia Sovetov Samara – 2012–2014
 Thiago Maciel – FC Alania Vladikavkaz – 2005
 Rodrigo Tiuí – FC Terek Grozny – 2010–2011
 Vanderlei – FC Alania Vladikavkaz – 2003
 Bruno Viana – FC Khimki – 2022
 Victor – FC Amkar Perm – 2010
 Vitinho – PFC CSKA Moscow – 2013–2014, 2017–2018
 Felipe Vizeu – FC Akhmat Grozny – 2020
 Jorge Wagner – FC Lokomotiv Moscow – 2003–2004
 Wágner – FC Lokomotiv Moscow – 2009–2010
 Wanderson – FC Krasnodar – 2017–2021
 Wánderson – FC Krasnodar, FC Dynamo Moscow – 2012–2017
 Welinton – FC Alania Vladikavkaz – 2013
 Welliton – FC Spartak Moscow – 2007–2012
 Wendel – FC Zenit Saint Petersburg – 2020–2023
 Willer – FC Anzhi Makhachkala, FC Luch-Energiya Vladivostok – 2002, 2006
 William – FC Amkar Perm, FC Ufa – 2009, 2014
 Willian – FC Anzhi Makhachkala – 2013
 Willyan – PFC CSKA Moscow – 2022–2023
 Xandão – FC Kuban Krasnodar, FC Anzhi Makhachkala – 2013–2016
 Zelão – FC Saturn Ramenskoye, FC Kuban Krasnodar – 2008–2012

Bulgaria
 Mihail Aleksandrov – FC Arsenal Tula – 2017–2018
 Atanas Bornosuzov – FC Tom Tomsk – 2005–2006
 Nikolay Dimitrov – FC Ural Sverdlovsk Oblast – 2017–2020
 Viktor Genev – FC Krylia Sovetov Samara – 2011
 Tsvetan Genkov – FC Dynamo Moscow – 2007–2009
 Blagoy Georgiev – FC Terek Grozny, FC Amkar Perm, FC Rubin Kazan, FC Orenburg – 2009–2017
 Ventsislav Hristov – FC SKA-Khabarovsk – 2017
 Valentin Iliev – FC Terek Grozny – 2008–2009
 Ivan Ivanov – FC Alania Vladikavkaz, FC Arsenal Tula – 2010, 2017
 Georgi Kostadinov – FC Arsenal Tula – 2018–2022
 Martin Kushev – FC Shinnik Yaroslavl, FC Amkar Perm – 2003–2010
 Zdravko Lazarov – FC Shinnik Yaroslavl – 2008
 Dimitar Makriev – FC Krylia Sovetov Samara – 2011
 Georgi Milanov – PFC CSKA Moscow – 2013–2018
 Zhivko Milanov – FC Tom Tomsk – 2013–2014
 Aleksandar Mladenov – FC Tom Tomsk – 2006–2008
 Stanislav Manolev – FC Kuban Krasnodar, FC Dynamo Moscow – 2014–2016
 Plamen Nikolov – FC Tom Tomsk – 2012–2013
 Georgi Peev – FC Amkar Perm – 2007–2016
 Ivaylo Petkov – FC Kuban Krasnodar – 2004, 2007
 Svetoslav Petrov – FC Kuban Krasnodar – 2004
 Ivelin Popov – FC Kuban Krasnodar, FC Spartak Moscow, FC Rubin Kazan, FC Rostov, PFC Sochi – 2012–2022
 Zahari Sirakov – FC Amkar Perm – 2004–2015
 Mateo Stamatov – FC Orenburg – 2022–2023
 Radostin Stanev – FC Shinnik Yaroslavl – 2003
 Ivan Stoyanov – FC Alania Vladikavkaz – 2010
 Dimitar Telkiyski – FC Amkar Perm – 2009
 Todor Timonov – FC Anzhi Makhachkala – 2010
 Dimitar Trendafilov – FC Fakel Voronezh – 1997
 Chavdar Yankov – FC Rostov – 2010–2011
 Evgeni Yordanov – FC Amkar Perm – 2005–2006
 Petar Zanev – FC Amkar Perm, FC Yenisey Krasnoyarsk – 2013–2019

Burkina Faso
 Ibrahim Gnanou – FC Alania Vladikavkaz – 2010
 Charles Kaboré – FC Kuban Krasnodar, FC Krasnodar, FC Dynamo Moscow – 2013–2021
 Mohamed Konaté – FC Ural Sverdlovsk Oblast, FC Tambov, FC Khimki, FC Akhmat Grozny – 2016, 2019–2022
 Bakary Koné – FC Arsenal Tula – 2019
 Herve Xavier Zengue – FC Terek Grozny – 2010–2012

Burundi
 Parfait Bizoza – FC Ufa – 2021

Cameroon
 Benoît Angbwa – FC Krylia Sovetov Samara, FC Saturn Moscow Oblast, FC Anzhi Makhachkala, FC Rostov – 2006–2013
 Mvondo Atangana – FC Terek Grozny – 2005
 Samuel Didier Biang – FC Kuban Krasnodar – 2004
 André Bikey – FC Shinnik Yaroslavl, FC Lokomotiv Moscow – 2005–2006
 Jean Bouli – FC Terek Grozny – 2008–2009
 Petrus Boumal – FC Ural Yekaterinburg, FC Nizhny Novgorod – 2017–2021
 Serge Branco – FC Shinnik Yaroslavl, FC Krylia Sovetov Samara – 2005–2007
 Hans Eric Ekounga – FC Chernomorets Novorossiysk – 1998–1999
 David Embé – FC Chernomorets Novorossiysk – 2001
 Guy Stéphane Essame – FC Terek Grozny – 2008–2012
 Samuel Eto'o – FC Anzhi Makhachkala – 2011–2013
 Bruno Koagne Tokam – FC Chernomorets Novorossiysk – 1998–1999
 Didier Lamkel Zé – FC Khimki – 2022
 Moumi Ngamaleu – FC Dynamo Moscow – 2022–2023
 Jupiter Yves Ngangue – FC Anzhi Makhachkala – 2001
 Bertrand Ngapounou – FC Rostov – 2004
 Clinton N'Jie – FC Dynamo Moscow – 2019–2022
 Gaël Ondoua – FC Anzhi Makhachkala – 2018–2019
 Ambroise Oyongo – FC Krasnodar – 2021
 Michel Pensée – FC Anzhi Makhachkala – 2001
 Alex Song – FC Rubin Kazan – 2016–2017
 Alphonse Tchami – FC Chernomorets Novorossiysk – 2001
 Jerry-Christian Tchuissé – FC Chernomorets Novorossiysk, FC Spartak Moscow, FC Moscow – 1998–2006
 Adolphe Teikeu – FC Krasnodar, FC Terek Grozny – 2013, 2015
 Luc Zoa – FC Spartak Moscow – 2004

Canada
 Joseph Di Chiara – FC Krylia Sovetov Samara – 2011–2012
 Richie Ennin – FC Nizhny Novgorod – 2021–2022
 Ante Jazić – FC Kuban Krasnodar – 2004

Cape Verde
 Zé Luís – FC Spartak Moscow, FC Lokomotiv Moscow – 2015–2021
 Kevin Pina – FC Krasnodar – 2022–2023
 Nuno Rocha – FC Tosno – 2017–2018

Central African Republic
 Cédric Yambéré – FC Anzhi Makhachkala – 2016

Chad
 Ezechiel N'Douassel – FC Terek Grozny – 2012–2013

Chile
 Gerson Acevedo – FC Ural Sverdlovsk Oblast – 2013–2016
 Mark González – PFC CSKA Moscow – 2009–2013
 Eduardo Lobos – FC Krylia Sovetov Samara – 2005–2010
 Víctor Méndez – PFC CSKA Moscow – 2022–2023
 Marco Villaseca – FC Rostov – 2004

Colombia
 Wilmar Barrios – FC Zenit Saint Petersburg – 2019–2023
 Daniel Buitrago – PFC Spartak Nalchik – 2012
 Jorge Carrascal – PFC CSKA Moscow – 2022–2023
 Mateo Cassierra – PFC Sochi, FC Zenit Saint Petersburg – 2021–2023
 Roger Cañas – FC Sibir Novosibirsk – 2010
 Jhon Córdoba – FC Krasnodar – 2021–2023
 Juan Carlos Escobar – FC Krylia Sovetov Samara – 2007–2011
 Ricardo Laborde – FC Krasnodar – 2013–2018
 Dilan Ortiz – FC Ufa – 2022
 Darwin Quintero – FC Krylia Sovetov Samara – 2007
 Jherson Vergara – FC Arsenal Tula – 2016–2017

Congo
 Emmerson – FC Ural Yekaterinburg – 2022–2023
 Delvin N'Dinga – FC Lokomotiv Moscow – 2015–2016
 Maurice Pedro – FC Anzhi Makhachkala – 2001
 Christopher Samba – FC Anzhi Makhachkala, FC Dynamo Moscow – 2012–2016

Congo DR
 Jeremy Bokila – FC Terek Grozny – 2013–2015
 Giannelli Imbula – PFC Sochi – 2020
 Patrick Etshimi – PFC Spartak Nalchik – 2010
 Chris Mavinga – FC Rubin Kazan – 2013
 Mulumba Mukendi – FC Volga Nizhny Novgorod – 2013–2014
 Ilongo Ngasanya – PFC Spartak Nalchik – 2006
 Joël Tshibamba – FC Krylia Sovetov Samara – 2012

Costa Rica
 Felicio Brown Forbes – FC Krylia Sovetov Samara, FC Ufa, FC Arsenal Tula, FC Anzhi Makhachkala, FC Amkar Perm – 2013–2014, 2016–2018
 Carlos Castro – FC Rubin Kazan – 2003
 Jimmy Marín – FC Orenburg – 2022–2023
 Winston Parks – FC Lokomotiv Moscow, FC Saturn Ramenskoye – 2003–2005
 Marco Ureña – FC Kuban Krasnodar – 2011–2014
 Berny Wright – FC Krylia Sovetov Samara – 2003

Croatia
 Mateo Barać – PFC Sochi, PFC Krylia Sovetov Samara – 2021–2022
 Tonči Bašić – FC Alania Vladikavkaz – 2001
 Silvije Begić – FC Orenburg, FC Rubin Kazan, PFC Krylia Sovetov Samara, FC Ural Yekaterinburg – 2018–2023
 Kristijan Bistrović – PFC CSKA Moscow – 2018–2021
 Igor Budiša – FC Shinnik Yaroslavl – 2005–2006
 Mijo Caktaš – FC Rubin Kazan – 2016–2017
 Vedran Celiščak – FC Torpedo-Metallurg Moscow – 2003
 Josip Čondrić – FC Rotor Volgograd – 2020–2021
 Vedran Ćorluka – FC Lokomotiv Moscow – 2012–2021
 Mario Ćurić – FC Torpedo Moscow – 2022
 Marko Dinjar – FC Terek Grozny – 2008
 Tomislav Dujmović – FC Amkar Perm, FC Lokomotiv Moscow, FC Dynamo Moscow, FC Mordovia Saransk – 2006–2013
 Matija Dvorneković – FC Volga Nizhny Novgorod – 2012–2013
 Marko Dugandžić – PFC Sochi – 2020–2021
 Danijel Hrman – FC Spartak Moscow – 2003
 Ivo Iličević – FC Anzhi Makhachkala – 2016
 Tin Jedvaj – FC Lokomotiv Moscow – 2021–2022
 Edin Junuzović – FC Amkar Perm – 2009
 Josip Knežević – FC Amkar Perm – 2010–2011
 Dario Krešić – FC Lokomotiv Moscow – 2012–2013
 Matija Kristić – FC Luch-Energiya Vladivostok – 2008
 Ivica Križanac – FC Zenit St. Petersburg – 2005–2010
 Marko Livaja – FC Rubin Kazan – 2014–2015
 Dejan Lovren – FC Zenit St. Petersburg – 2020–2022
 Hrvoje Milić – FC Rostov – 2013–2015
 Danijel Miškić – FC Orenburg, FC Ural Yekaterinburg – 2018–2023
 Nikola Moro – FC Dynamo Moscow – 2020–2022
 Filip Mrzljak – FC Ufa – 2020–2022
 Zoran Nižić – FC Akhmat Grozny – 2019–2023
 Igor Novaković – FC Tom Tomsk – 2006–2007
 Ivica Olić – PFC CSKA Moscow – 2003–2006
 Mario Pašalić – FC Spartak Moscow – 2017–2018
 Ivan Paurević – FC Ufa – 2014–2019
 Boris Pavić – FC Chernomorets Novorossiysk – 2001
 Ante Pešić – PFC CSKA Moscow – 1999
 Stipe Pletikosa – FC Spartak Moscow, FC Rostov – 2007–2009, 2011–2015
 Ante Puljić – FC Tom Tomsk – 2016–2017
 Dejan Radonjić – FC Krylia Sovetov Samara – 2019–2020
 Zvonimir Šarlija – PFC CSKA Moscow – 2019
 Gordon Schildenfeld – FC Dynamo Moscow – 2012
 Marko Šimić – FC Khimki – 2007, 2009
 Stjepan Skočibušić – FC Torpedo Moscow – 2006
 Stjepan Tomas – FC Rubin Kazan – 2007–2009
 Filip Uremović – FC Rubin Kazan – 2018–2022
 Hrvoje Vejić – FC Tom Tomsk – 2005–2008
 Nikola Vlašić – PFC CSKA Moscow – 2018–2021
 Marijan Vuka – FC Kuban Krasnodar – 2004
 Ognjen Vukojević – FC Spartak Moscow – 2013
 Danijel Vušković – FC Luch-Energiya Vladivostok – 2008
 Ivica Žunić – FC Orenburg – 2016

Czech Republic
 Erich Brabec – FC Dynamo Moscow, FC Alania Vladikavkaz – 2002–2004
 Marek Čech – FC Luch-Energiya Vladivostok, FC Lokomotiv Moscow – 2007–2009
 Tomáš Čížek – FC Rubin Kazan, FC Moscow, FC Sibir Novosibirsk – 2003–2008, 2010
 Richard Dostálek – FC Rubin Kazan – 2004
 Lukáš Droppa – FC Tom Tomsk – 2016
 Jan Flachbart – FC Zenit St. Petersburg – 2004–2005
 Lukáš Hartig – FC Zenit St. Petersburg – 2003–2005
 Martin Hašek – FC Dynamo Moscow – 2004
 Jan Holenda – FC Anzhi Makhachkala, FC Rostov, FC Tom Tomsk – 2010–2014
 Martin Horák – FC Zenit St. Petersburg, FC Rostov, FC Shinnik Yaroslavl, FC Sibir Novosibirsk – 2003–2007, 2010
 Roman Hubník – FC Moscow – 2007–2008
 Martin Hyský – FC Dynamo Moscow – 2002
 David Jablonský – FC Tom Tomsk – 2016
 Jiří Jarošík – PFC CSKA Moscow, FC Krylia Sovetov Samara – 2003–2004, 2008–2009
 Martin Jiránek – FC Spartak Moscow, FC Terek Grozny, FC Tom Tomsk – 2004–2014
 Luboš Kalouda – PFC CSKA Moscow – 2008
 Marek Kincl – FC Zenit St. Petersburg – 2004
 Antonín Kinský – FC Saturn Ramenskoye – 2004–2010
 Jan Koller – FC Krylia Sovetov Samara – 2008–2009
 Radoslav Kováč – FC Spartak Moscow – 2005–2008
 Alex Král – FC Spartak Moscow – 2019–2021
 Tomáš Kuchař – FC Shinnik Yaroslavl – 2003
 Jan Kuchta – FC Lokomotiv Moscow – 2022
 Roman Lengyel – FC Saturn Ramenskoye, FC Kuban Krasnodar, FC Rostov – 2004, 2007, 2009–2010
 Pavel Mareš – FC Zenit St. Petersburg – 2003–2006
 Tomáš Necid – PFC CSKA Moscow – 2009–2013
 Jaroslav Nesvadba – FC Zenit St. Petersburg – 2006
 Jiří Novotný – FC Rubin Kazan – 2003–2004
 Marian Palát – FC Luch-Energiya Vladivostok – 2007
 Michal Papadopulos – FC Rostov – 2011–2012
 Adam Petrouš – FC Rubin Kazan – 2004
 Radek Šírl – FC Zenit St. Petersburg – 2003–2009
 Marek Suchý – FC Spartak Moscow – 2010–2013
 Aleš Urbánek – FC Spartak Moscow – 2004
 Karel Urbánek – FC Lokomotiv Nizhny Novgorod – 1999
 Ondřej Vaněk – FC Ufa – 2016–2019
 Petr Vašek – FC Sibir Novosibirsk, FC Tom Tomsk – 2010, 2012–2014
 Stanislav Vlček – FC Dynamo Moscow – 2004
 Tomáš Vychodil – FC Tom Tomsk, FC Sibir Novosibirsk – 2005, 2010
 Martin Zbončák – FC Dynamo Moscow – 2004

Denmark
 Oliver Abildgaard – FC Rubin Kazan – 2020–2022
 Anders Dreyer – FC Rubin Kazan – 2021
 Michael Lumb – FC Zenit St. Petersburg – 2010–2012
 Younes Namli – FC Krasnodar – 2019

Ecuador
 Felipe Caicedo – FC Lokomotiv Moscow – 2011–2013
 Christian Noboa – FC Rubin Kazan, FC Dynamo Moscow, FC Rostov, FC Zenit St. Petersburg, PFC Sochi – 2007–2023
 Cristian Ramírez – FC Krasnodar – 2017–2023 (acquired Russian citizenship in 2021, is not eligible to play for Russia national team)

El Salvador
 Rodolfo Zelaya – FC Alania Vladikavkaz – 2013

England
 Tino Anjorin – FC Lokomotiv Moscow – 2021
 David Bentley – FC Rostov – 2012

Estonia
 Enar Jääger – FC Torpedo Moscow – 2005–2006
 Tarmo Kink – FC Spartak Moscow – 2003
 Andrei Krasnopjorov – PFC CSKA Moscow – 1999
 Dmitri Kruglov – FC Lokomotiv Moscow, FC Rostov – 2005–2006, 2011–2012
 Oleg Lepik – FC Chernomorets Novorossiysk – 1997–1999
 Jevgeni Novikov – FC Tom Tomsk – 2005
 Andres Oper – FC Torpedo Moscow – 2003–2005
 Sergei Pareiko – FC Rotor Volgograd, FC Tom Tomsk, FC Volga Nizhny Novgorod – 2001–2010, 2013–2014
 Andrei Stepanov – FC Torpedo Moscow, FC Khimki – 2004–2008
 Sergei Terehhov – FC Shinnik Yaroslavl – 2005
 Konstantin Vassiljev – FC Amkar Perm – 2011–2014
 Sergei Zenjov – FC Torpedo Moscow – 2015

Finland
 Alexei Eremenko – FC Saturn Ramenskoye, FC Rubin Kazan – 2006–2009, 2011–2013
 Roman Eremenko – FC Rubin Kazan, PFC CSKA Moscow, FC Spartak Moscow, FC Rostov – 2011–2016, 2018–2020
 Otto Fredrikson – PFC Spartak Nalchik – 2010–2012
 Juhani Ojala – FC Terek Grozny – 2013–2014
 Boris Rotenberg – FC Shinnik Yaroslavl, FC Khimki, FC Alania Vladikavkaz, FC Dynamo Moscow, FC Rostov, FC Lokomotiv Moscow – 2008–2010, 2013–2018
 Berat Sadik – FC Krylia Sovetov Samara – 2015–2017
 Jani Tapani Virtanen – FC Khimki – 2009

France
 Filipe Azevedo – FC Lokomotiv Moscow – 2000
 Alexis Beka Beka – FC Lokomotiv Moscow – 2021–2022
 Mohamed Brahimi – FC Fakel Voronezh – 2023
 Rémy Cabella – FC Krasnodar – 2019–2021
 Djibril Cissé – FC Kuban Krasnodar – 2013
 Lassana Diarra – FC Anzhi Makhachkala, FC Lokomotiv Moscow – 2012–2014
 Johann Duveau – FC Torpedo Moscow – 2000
 Mounir El Haimour – FC Alania Vladikavkaz – 2004
 Samuel Gigot – FC Spartak Moscow – 2018–2022
 Wilson Isidor – FC Lokomotiv Moscow – 2022
 Steeve Joseph-Reinette – FC Sibir Novosibirsk, FC Krylia Sovetov Samara – 2010–2013
 Damien Le Tallec – FC Mordovia Saransk, FC Torpedo Moscow – 2014–2015, 2022 (acquired Russian citizenship in 2020)
 Yohan Mollo – FC Krylia Sovetov Samara, FC Zenit St. Petersburg – 2015–2018
 Yann M'Vila – FC Rubin Kazan – 2013–2014, 2016–2017
 Gabriel Obertan – FC Anzhi Makhachkala – 2016
 Thomas Phibel – FC Amkar Perm, FC Mordovia Saransk, FC Anzhi Makhachkala – 2013–2017
 Sébastien Puygrenier – FC Zenit St. Petersburg – 2008
 Réda Rabeï – FC Fakel Voronezh – 2023
 Sébastien Sansoni – FC Khimki – 2009
 Florent Sinama Pongolle – FC Rostov – 2012–2014
 William Vainqueur – FC Dynamo Moscow – 2014–2015
 Mathieu Valbuena – FC Dynamo Moscow – 2014–2015

Gabon
 Guélor Kanga – FC Rostov – 2013–2016

Gambia
 Ebrima Ebou Sillah – FC Rubin Kazan – 2003–2005
 Ali Sowe – FC Rostov – 2021–2022

Georgia
 Valeri Abramidze – FC Spartak Moscow, FC Uralan Elista – 2002–2003
 Rati Aleksidze – FC Rostov – 2004
 Besik Amashukeli – FC Lada Togliatti – 1996
 Aleksandre Amisulashvili – FC Shinnik Yaroslavl, PFC Spartak Nalchik, FC Krasnodar, FC Krylia Sovetov Samara – 2006–2014
 Jano Ananidze – FC Spartak Moscow, FC Rostov, FC Krylia Sovetov Samara – 2009–2019
 Giorgi Arabidze – FC Rotor Volgograd – 2021
 Zurab Arziani – FC Anzhi Makhachkala, FC Volga Nizhny Novgorod – 2010–2011
 Malkhaz Asatiani – FC Lokomotiv Moscow – 2003–2010
 Mikheil Ashvetia – FC Alania Vladikavkaz, FC Lokomotiv Moscow, FC Rostov, FC Rubin Kazan – 1997, 2000, 2002–2006
 Revaz Barabadze – FC Anzhi Makhachkala – 2010
 Besik Beradze – FC Chernomorets Novorossiysk – 1996–1998
 Paata Berishvili – FC Dynamo Stavropol – 1992
 Gennadi Bondaruk – FC Zhemchuzhina Sochi – 1993–1999
 Vladimir Burduli – FC Alania Vladikavkaz – 2005
 David Chaladze – FC Alania Vladikavkaz, FC Rubin Kazan – 1998, 2003
 Giorgi Chanturia – FC Alania Vladikavkaz, FC Ural Sverdlovsk Oblast – 2013, 2016–2018
 Soso Chedia – FC KamAZ-Chally Naberezhnye Chelny – 1996
 Giorgi Chelidze – FC Lokomotiv Moscow – 2005–2006
 Davit Chichveishvili – FC Alania Vladikavkaz – 1999
 Gia Chkhaidze – FC Alania Vladikavkaz – 1999
 Vitali Daraselia Jr. – FC Alania Vladikavkaz – 2004–2005
 Zuriko Davitashvili – FC Rubin Kazan, FC Rotor Volgograd, FC Arsenal Tula – 2019–2022
 Giorgi Davitnidze – FC Uralan Elista – 2000
 Giorgi Demetradze – FC Alania Vladikavkaz, FC Lokomotiv Moscow – 1998–1999, 2002, 2005
 Akaki Devadze – FC Rostselmash Rostov-on-Don – 1995–1996
 Giorgi Dzneladze – FC Krylia Sovetov Samara – 1992–1993
 Iuri Gabiskiria – FC KamAZ-Chally Naberezhnye Chelny – 1996
 Luka Gagnidze – FC Ural Yekaterinburg, FC Dynamo Moscow – 2021–2023
 Giorgi Gakhokidze – FC Alania Vladikavkaz – 1997–1998
 Rezo Gavtadze – FC Ural Yekaterinburg – 2016
 Aleksandre Geladze – FC Zhemchuzhina Sochi – 1998
 Irakli Geperidze – PFC Spartak Nalchik – 2006
 Zurab Gigashvili – FC Tambov – 2020–2021
 Vasil Gigiadze – FC Uralan Elista – 2003
 Giorgi Gogiashvili – FC Zhemchuzhina Sochi – 1996–1999
 Aleksandre Gogoberishvili – FC Anzhi Makhachkala – 2000
 Gocha Gogrichiani – FC Zhemchuzhina Sochi, FC Lokomotiv Nizhny Novgorod – 1993, 1996–1999
 Gogita Gogua – PFC Spartak Nalchik, FC Saturn Ramenskoye, FC Terek Grozny, FC Volga Nizhny Novgorod – 2006–2011
 Shota Grigalashvili – FC Alania Vladikavkaz – 2012
 Gia Grigalava – FC Rostov, FC Moscow, FC Volga Nizhny Novgorod, FC Krylia Sovetov Samara, FC Anzhi Makhachkala, FC Arsenal Tula, FC Khimki – 2007, 2009–2014, 2017–2022
 Soso Grishikashvili – FC Spartak-Alania Vladikavkaz – 1995
 Giorgi Gudushauri – FC Torpedo Moscow – 1998
 Gocha Gujabidze – FC Rostselmash Rostov-on-Don – 1995
 Davit Gvaramadze – FC Krylia Sovetov Samara – 1999–2000
 Levan Gvazava – FC Alania Vladikavkaz, PFC Spartak Nalchik, FC Luch-Energiya Vladivostok, FC Terek Grozny – 2004–2011
 Giorgi Iluridze – FC Anzhi Makhachkala – 2010
 Grigol Imedadze – FC Alania Vladikavkaz – 2002
 Gela Inalishvili – FC Krylia Sovetov Samara – 1997
 Zurab Ionanidze – FC Zhemchuzhina Sochi, FC Lokomotiv Nizhny Novgorod – 1996–1997
 Gocha Jamarauli – FC Alania Vladikavkaz – 1996
 Davit Janashia – FC Zhemchuzhina Sochi, FC Chernomorets Novorossiysk – 1996–1997
 Zaza Janashia – FC Lokomotiv Moscow – 1996–2001
 Gizo Jeladze – FC Zhemchuzhina Sochi – 1999
 Mikheil Jishkariani – FC KamAZ-Chally Naberezhnye Chelny – 1995–1997
 Jaba Kankava – FC Alania Vladikavkaz – 2005
 Mikheil Kavelashvili – FC Alania Vladikavkaz – 1995, 2004
 Otar Khizaneishvili – FC Spartak Moscow, FC Rostselmash Rostov-on-Don, FC Dynamo Moscow, FC Anzhi Makhachkala – 2000–2001, 2004, 2010
 David Khmelidze – FC Rostselmash Rostov-on-Don – 2001
 Gocha Khojava – FC Rostov, FC Anzhi Makhachkala, FC Volga Nizhny Novgorod – 2005, 2010–2011
 Akaki Khubutia – FC Mordovia Saransk –  2013
 Georgi Kinkladze – FC Rubin Kazan – 2005–2006
 Mamuka Kobakhidze – FC Rubin Kazan, FC Mordovia Saransk – 2014–2016
 Levan Kobiashvili – FC Alania Vladikavkaz – 1997
 Dimitri Kudinov – FC Zhemchuzhina Sochi – 1997
 Khvicha Kvaratskhelia – FC Lokomotiv Moscow, FC Rubin Kazan – 2019–2022
 Irakli Kvekveskiri – FC Fakel Voronezh – 2022–2023
 Davit Kvirkvelia – FC Alania Vladikavkaz, FC Rubin Kazan, FC Anzhi Makhachkala – 2005, 2008–2010
 Solomon Kvirkvelia – FC Rubin Kazan, FC Lokomotiv Moscow, FC Rotor Volgograd – 2011–2021
 Giorgi Ladaria – FC Chernomorets Novorossiysk – 1996
 Jaba Lipartia – FC Anzhi Makhachkala – 2017
 Elguja Lobjanidze – FC Orenburg – 2017
 Nugzar Lobzhanidze – PFC CSKA Moscow – 1997
 Giorgi Lomaia – FC Spartak Moscow, FC Luch-Energiya Vladivostok – 2004, 2006
 Giorgi Loria – FC Krylia Sovetov Samara, FC Anzhi Makhachkala – 2015–2018
 Otar Martsvaladze – FC Volga Nizhny Novgorod, FC Krasnodar – 2011–2012
 Zurab Menteshashvili – FC Spartak-Alania Vladikavkaz, FC Shinnik Yaroslavl – 2003, 2006
 Beka Mikeltadze – FC Rubin Kazan, FC Rotor Volgograd – 2019–2020
 Mamuka Minashvili – FC Krylia Sovetov Samara – 1994–1998
 Lasha Monaselidze – FC Torpedo Moscow – 1998
 Davit Mujiri – FC Krylia Sovetov Samara, FC Lokomotiv Moscow – 2006–2009
 Kakhaber Mzhavanadze – FC Spartak Moscow, FC Anzhi Makhachkala – 2001–2002
 Giorgi Navalovski – FC SKA-Khabarovsk – 2017–2018
 Tornike Okriashvili – FC Krasnodar – 2016–2018
 Zurab Popkhadze – FC Krylia Sovetov Samara, FC Lokomotiv Nizhny Novgorod, FC Alania Vladikavkaz – 1997–2001
 Mikheil Potskhveria – FC Alania Vladikavkaz – 2000
 Aleksandre Rekhviashvili – FC Torpedo-Metallurg Moscow – 2003
 Giorgi Revazishvili – FC Krylia Sovetov Samara – 1998
 Nukri Revishvili – FC Rubin Kazan, FC Anzhi Makhachkala, FC Krasnodar, FC Mordovia Saransk – 2006–2007, 2009–2012, 2015–2016
 Zaza Revishvili – FC Alania Vladikavkaz – 1995–1996
 Guja Rukhaia – PFC Spartak Nalchik – 2011–2012
 Edik Sajaia – FC Torpedo Moscow – 2001–2002
 Lasha Salukvadze – FC Rubin Kazan, FC Volga Nizhny Novgorod – 2005–2011
 Saba Sazonov – FC Zenit Saint Petersburg, FC Dynamo Moscow – 2021–2023
 Vaso Sepashvili – FC Lada Togliatti – 1996
 Giorgi Shashiashvili – FC Alania Vladikavkaz – 2005
 Murtaz Shelia – FC Alania Vladikavkaz – 1995–1997
 Levan Silagadze – FC Alania Vladikavkaz, FC Rubin Kazan – 2000, 2003
 David Siradze – PFC Spartak Nalchik – 2008–2012
 Jemal Tabidze – FC Ural Yekaterinburg, FC Ufa – 2017–2021
 Said Tarba – FC Zhemchuzhina Sochi – 1995
 Sevasti Todua – FC Uralan Elista – 2002
 Mamuka Tsereteli – FC Alania Vladikavkaz – 1998–2000
 Zurab Tsiskaridze – FC Amkar Perm – 2011
 Kakhaber Tskhadadze – FC Spartak Moscow, FC Dynamo Moscow, FC Alania Vladikavkaz – 1992, 1997
 Mate Vatsadze – FC Volga Nizhny Novgorod – 2011

Germany
 Robert Bauer – FC Arsenal Tula – 2019–2021
 Patrick Ebert – FC Spartak Moscow – 2014–2015
 Malik Fathi – FC Spartak Moscow – 2008–2009
 Benedikt Höwedes – FC Lokomotiv Moscow – 2018–2020
 Kevin Kurányi – FC Dynamo Moscow – 2010–2015
 Maximilian Philipp – FC Dynamo Moscow – 2019–2020
 Marvin Pourié – FC Ufa – 2015–2016
 André Schürrle – FC Spartak Moscow – 2019
 Serdar Tasci – FC Spartak Moscow – 2014–2018

Ghana
 Baba Adamu – FC Chernomorets Novorossiysk, FC Rostselmash Rostov-on-Don, FC Lokomotiv Moscow, FC Moscow, FC Krylia Sovetov Samara – 2001–2002, 2004–2006
 Lawrence Adjei – FC Spartak Moscow – 2001
 Prince Koranteng Amoako – FC Saturn Ramenskoye – 2001–2004
 Haminu Draman – FC Lokomotiv Moscow, FC Kuban Krasnodar – 2007–2010
 Joel Fameyeh – FC Orenburg – 2019–2020
 Emmanuel Frimpong – FC Ufa, FC Arsenal Tula – 2014–2016
 Baffour Gyan – FC Dynamo Moscow, FC Saturn Ramenskoye – 2004–2008
 Mohammed Kadiri – FC Arsenal Tula – 2018–2020
 Laryea Kingston – FC Krylia Sovetov Samara, FC Terek Grozny, FC Lokomotiv Moscow – 2004–2006
 Emmanuel Osei Kuffour – FC Anzhi Makhachkala – 2002
 Jonathan Mensah – FC Anzhi Makhachkala – 2016
 Kwadkwo Poku – FC Anzhi Makhachkala – 2018
 Quincy – FC Spartak Moscow – 2006–2007, 2009
 Mohammed Rabiu – FC Kuban Krasnodar, FC Anzhi Makhachkala, FC Krylia Sovetov Samara, FC Tambov – 2013–2016, 2018–2020
 Illiasu Shilla – FC Saturn Ramenskoye – 2006–2007
 Abdul Aziz Tetteh – FC Dynamo Moscow – 2018–2019
 Patrick Twumasi – FC Amkar Perm – 2014
 Mubarak Wakaso – FC Rubin Kazan – 2013–2014
 Abdul Majeed Waris – FC Spartak Moscow – 2013–2014

Greece
 Nikos Karelis – FC Amkar Perm – 2012–2013
 Giourkas Seitaridis – FC Dynamo Moscow – 2005

Guinea
 Ibrahima Cissé – FC Ural Yekaterinburg – 2022
 Sékou Condé – FC Amkar Perm – 2016–2018
 François Kamano – FC Lokomotiv Moscow – 2020–2023
 Momo Yansané – FC Pari Nizhny Novgorod – 2022–2023

Guinea-Bissau
 Janio Bikel – FC Khimki – 2023
 Cícero – FC Dynamo Moscow – 2005–2007
 Almami Moreira – FC Dynamo Moscow – 2006

Haiti
 Réginal Goreux – FC Krylia Sovetov Samara, FC Rostov – 2013–2014

Hungary
 Balázs Dzsudzsák – FC Anzhi Makhachkala, FC Dynamo Moscow – 2011–2015
 Miklós Gaál – FC Amkar Perm, FC Volga Nizhny Novgorod – 2007–2011
 Szabolcs Huszti – FC Zenit St. Petersburg – 2009–2012
 Ákos Kecskés – FC Pari Nizhny Novgorod – 2021–2022
 Vladimir Koman – FC Krasnodar, FC Ural Sverdlovsk Oblast – 2012–2014
 Márk Koszta – FC Torpedo Moscow – 2022
 Norbert Németh – FC Tom Tomsk – 2009–2010
 Ádám Pintér – FC Tom Tomsk – 2013–2014
 Tamás Priskin – FC Alania Vladikavkaz – 2012–2013
 Szabolcs Sáfár – FC Spartak Moscow – 2003

Iceland
 Jón Guðni Fjóluson – FC Krasnodar – 2018–2020
 Sverrir Ingi Ingason – FC Rostov – 2017–2018
 Viðar Örn Kjartansson – FC Rostov, FC Rubin Kazan – 2018–2019
 Hörður Björgvin Magnússon – PFC CSKA Moscow – 2018–2022
 Sölvi Ottesen – FC Ural Sverdlovsk Oblast – 2013–2014
 Björn Bergmann Sigurðarson – FC Rostov – 2018–2019
 Arnór Sigurðsson – PFC CSKA Moscow – 2018–2021
 Hannes Sigurðsson – PFC Spartak Nalchik – 2011
 Ragnar Sigurðsson – FC Krasnodar, FC Rubin Kazan, FC Rostov – 2014–2019
 Arnór Smárason – FC Torpedo Moscow – 2015

Iran
 Sardar Azmoun – FC Rubin Kazan, FC Rostov, FC Zenit Saint Petersburg – 2013–2021
 Saeid Ezatolahi – FC Rostov, FC Anzhi Makhachkala, FC Amkar Perm – 2016–2018
 Milad Mohammadi – FC Akhmat Grozny – 2016–2019
 Reza Shekari – FC Rubin Kazan – 2018

Iraq
 Safaa Hadi – PFC Krylia Sovetov Samara – 2020

Ireland
 Aiden McGeady – FC Spartak Moscow – 2010–2013

Israel
 Dani Bondar – FC Volga Nizhny Novgorod – 2011–2012
 Eli Dasa – FC Dynamo Moscow – 2022–2023
 Edi Gotlieb – FC Orenburg – 2019–2020
 Ze'ev Haimovich – FC Terek Grozny – 2009–2011
 Bibras Natcho – FC Rubin Kazan, PFC CSKA Moscow – 2010–2018
 Toto Tamuz – FC Ural Sverdlovsk Oblast – 2013

Italy
 Salvatore Bocchetti – FC Rubin Kazan, FC Spartak Moscow – 2010–2019
 Domenico Criscito – FC Zenit St. Petersburg – 2011–2018
 Alessandro Dal Canto – FC Uralan Elista – 2003
 Claudio Marchisio – FC Zenit St. Petersburg – 2018
 Cristian Pasquato – FC Krylia Sovetov Samara – 2016–2017
 Dario Passoni – FC Uralan Elista – 2003
 Ivan Pelizzoli – FC Lokomotiv Moscow – 2007–2008
 Alessandro Rosina – FC Zenit St. Petersburg – 2009–2012
 Francesco Ruopolo – FC Lokomotiv Moscow – 2005

Ivory Coast
 Victorien Angban – PFC Sochi – 2021–2022
 Yacouba Bamba – FC Orenburg – 2016
 Yannick Boli – FC Anzhi Makhachkala – 2015–2016
 Jean-Jacques Bougouhi – FC Ural Sverdlovsk Oblast – 2016–2017
 Idrissa Doumbia – FC Akhmat Grozny – 2018
 Seydou Doumbia – PFC CSKA Moscow – 2010–2015
 Jean-Philippe Gbamin – PFC CSKA Moscow – 2022
 Roman Mory Gbane – FC Khimki – 2022–2023
 Cédric Gogoua – FC Tambov, PFC CSKA Moscow, FC Rotor Volgograd – 2019–2021
 Dacosta Goore – FC Luch-Energiya Vladivostok, FC Moscow, FC Alania Vladikavkaz – 2008–2010, 2012–2013
 Eboue Kouassi – FC Krasnodar – 2016
 Igor Lolo – FC Kuban Krasnodar, FC Rostov – 2011–2015
 Habib Maïga – FC Arsenal Tula – 2018
 Marco Né – FC Kuban Krasnodar – 2011
 Abdul Razak – FC Anzhi Makhachkala – 2013
 Senin Sebai – FC Khimki, FC Akhmat Grozny – 2021–2022
 Lacina Traoré – FC Kuban Krasnodar, FC Anzhi Makhachkala, PFC CSKA Moscow – 2011–2013, 2016

Jamaica
 Shamar Nicholson – FC Spartak Moscow – 2022–2023
 Damani Ralph – FC Rubin Kazan – 2005, 2007
 Robert Scarlett – FC Spartak Moscow – 2002
 Luton Shelton – FC Volga Nizhny Novgorod – 2013–2014
 Errol Stevens – FC Khimki – 2009

Japan
 Takafumi Akahoshi – FC Ufa – 2014
 Kento Hashimoto – FC Rostov – 2020–2022
 Keisuke Honda – PFC CSKA Moscow – 2010–2013
 Seiichiro Maki – FC Amkar Perm – 2010
 Daisuke Matsui – FC Tom Tomsk – 2010
 Takuma Nishimura – PFC CSKA Moscow – 2018–2019
 Mitsuki Saito – FC Rubin Kazan – 2021

Jordan
 Badran Al-Shaqran – FC KamAZ-Chally Naberezhnye Chelny – 1995–1997
 Adnan Al-Shuaibat – FC KamAZ-Chally Naberezhnye Chelny – 1995–1996

Kazakhstan
 Vitaliy Abramov – FC Tekstilshchik Kamyshin, FC Rotor Volgograd – 1995–1999
 Yuri Aksenov – FC Uralan Elista – 1998–1999, 2002
 Nuraly Alip – FC Zenit St. Petersburg – 2022
 Igor Avdeyev – FC Alania Vladikavkaz – 1997
 Akmal Bakhtiyarov – PFC Sochi – 2019–2020
 Ruslan Baltiyev – FC Sokol Saratov, FC Dynamo Moscow, FC Moscow, FC Shinnik Yaroslavl – 2001–2005
 Aleksandr Bogatyryov – FC Tekstilshchik Kamyshin – 1992
 Marat Bystrov – FC Akhmat Grozny – 2020–2022
 Sergei Chekmezov – FC Zhemchuzhina Sochi, PFC Krylia Sovetov Samara – 1993–1994
 Oleg Chukhleba – FC Lada Togliatti, FC Lokomotiv Nizhny Novgorod – 1994, 1996
 Viktor Dmitrenko – FC Kuban Krasnodar – 2009
 Renat Dubinskiy – FC Shinnik Yaroslavl – 2002–2005
 Vadim Egoshkin – FC Chernomorets Novorossiysk – 1996
 Aleksandr Familtsev – FC Torpedo Moscow, FC Tom Tomsk – 2001, 2005
 Kazbek Geteriev – PFC Spartak Nalchik, FC Alania Vladikavkaz – 2007–2010, 2012
 Aleksandr Goncharenko – FC Luch Vladivostok – 1993
 Igor Grokhovskiy – FC Lokomotiv Nizhny Novgorod – 1994
 Yuri Ivanov – FC Lada Togliatti – 1994
 Askhat Kadyrkulov – PFC CSKA Moscow – 2000–2001
 Oleg Kapustnikov – FC KamAZ-Chally Naberezhnye Chelny – 1995
 Andrei Karpovich – FC Rostov, FC Dynamo Moscow – 2002–2003, 2007–2008
 Oleg Kornienko – FC Alania Vladikavkaz – 1994–1999
 Islambek Kuat – FC Orenburg, FC Khimki – 2020
 Andrei Kurdyumov – FC Zenit St. Petersburg, FC Chernomorets Novorossiysk – 1997–1999
 Konstantin Ledovskikh – FC Uralmash Yekaterinburg, FC Zhemchuzhina Sochi – 1993–1994, 1999
 David Loriya – PFC Spartak Nalchik – 2009
 Yevgeny Lovchev – FC Lokomotiv Moscow – 1996
 Dmitry Lyapkin – FC Energiya-Tekstilshchik Kamyshin, FC Saturn Ramenskoye, FC Khimki – 1996, 1999–2002, 2007
 Andrei Miroshnichenko – FC Rotor Volgograd, FC Lada Togliatti – 1993, 1996
 Aleksey Muldarov – FC Mordovia Saransk – 2012
 Oleg Musin – FC Sokol Saratov – 2001–2002
 Vladimir Niederhaus – FC Rotor Volgograd – 1992–1997, 1999
 Maksim Nizovtsev – FC Baltika Kaliningrad, PFC CSKA Moscow, FC Sokol Saratov, FC Chernomorets Novorossiysk – 1996–1999, 2001, 2003
 Yevgeni Ovshinov – FC Uralan Elista – 1999–2000, 2002–2003
 Konstantin Pavlyuchenko – FC Lada Togliatti, FC Tekstilshchik Kamyshin – 1994–1996
 Aleksei Popov – FC Amkar Perm, FC Rubin Kazan – 2004–2012
 Mikhail Rozhkov – FC Rostov – 2009
 Yerkebulan Seydakhmet – FC Ufa – 2018
 Aleksey Shchyotkin – FC Rotor Volgograd – 2021
 Maksim Shevchenko – FC KamAZ-Chally Naberezhnye Chelny, FC Chernomorets Novorossiysk – 1997, 1999–2001
 Dmitry Shomko – FC Rotor Volgograd – 2021
 Andrey Shkurin – FC Chernomorets Novorossiysk – 1995–1999
 Andrei Sidelnikov – PFC Spartak Nalchik – 2007
 Aleksandr Sklyarov – FC Baltika Kaliningrad – 1997
 Samat Smakov – FC Rostselmash Rostov-on-Don – 2000–2001
 Yevgeni Tarasov – FC Zenit St. Petersburg, FC Sokol Saratov – 2000–2002
 Sergey Timofeev – FC Dynamo Moscow, FC Alania Vladikavkaz – 1992–1997
 Arsen Tlekhugov – FC Lokomotiv Nizhny Novgorod – 2000
 Rafael Urazbakhtin – FC Rostselmash Rostov-on-Don – 2001
 Roman Uzdenov – PFC Spartak Nalchik – 2007
 Sergei Volgin – FC Tekstilshchik Kamyshin – 1993–1995
 Valeriy Yablochkin – FC Lokomotiv Moscow – 1997
 Sergei Yegorov – FC Uralan Elista – 1999
 Bakhtiyar Zaynutdinov – FC Rostov, PFC CSKA Moscow – 2019–2022
 Georgy Zhukov – FC Ural Sverdlovsk Oblast – 2016
 Sergey Zhunenko – FC Rotor Volgograd – 1992, 1994–1997

Kosovo
 Bernard Berisha – FC Anzhi Makhachkala, FC Terek Grozny, FC Akhmat Grozny – 2016–2023
 Ylldren Ibrahimaj – FC Ural Yekaterinburg – 2021

Kyrgyzstan
 Nazim Ajiev – FC Lokomotiv Nizhny Novgorod – 1995
 Sergei Ivanov – FC Anzhi Makhachkala – 2001–2002
 Valery Kichin – FC Volga Nizhny Novgorod, FC Yenisey Krasnoyarsk – 2013, 2018–2019
 Igor Tkachenko – FC Uralmash Yekaterinburg – 1992–1993

Latvia
 Vitālijs Astafjevs – FC Rubin Kazan – 2004–2005
 Oļegs Blagonadeždins – FC Spartak-Alania Vladikavkaz – 2003
 Aleksandrs Cauņa – PFC CSKA Moscow – 2011–2016
 Aleksandrs Isakovs – FC Lokomotiv Nizhny Novgorod, FC Alania Vladikavkaz – 1999–2000
 Valērijs Ivanovs – FC Uralan Elista, FC Shinnik Yaroslavl – 1998–1999
 Aleksandrs Jeļisejevs – FC Uralan Elista – 1998
 Vladimirs Kamešs – FC Amkar Perm – 2013
 Ģirts Karlsons – FC Shinnik Yaroslavl – 2004
 Oskars Kļava – FC Anzhi Makhachkala – 2010
 Vladimirs Koļesņičenko – FC Moscow – 2003–2004
 Aleksandrs Koliņko – FC Rostov, FC Rubin Kazan, PFC Spartak Nalchik – 2003–2007, 2010
 Juris Laizāns – PFC CSKA Moscow, FC Torpedo Moscow, FC Rostov, FC Kuban Krasnodar, FC Shinnik Yaroslavl – 2001–2008
 Valentīns Lobaņovs – FC Shinnik Yaroslavl – 1999
 Mihails Miholaps – FC Spartak-Alania Vladikavkaz – 2003
 Ēriks Pelcis – FC Anzhi Makhachkala – 2002
 Andrejs Prohorenkovs – FC Dynamo Moscow – 2004–2005
 Vīts Rimkus – FC Rostov – 2005
 Andrejs Rubins – FC Shinnik Yaroslavl, FC Spartak Moscow – 2003–2006
 Dzintars Sproģis – FC Energiya-Tekstilshchik Kamyshin – 1996
 Igors Stepanovs – FC Shinnik Yaroslavl – 2008
 Andrejs Štolcers – FC Spartak Moscow – 2000
 Igors Troickis – FC Baltika Kaliningrad – 1997
 Kirill Varaksin – FC KamAZ Naberezhnye Chelny – 1994

Liberia
 Sylvanus Nimely – FC Spartak Moscow – 2018
 Sekou Oliseh – PFC CSKA Moscow, FC Kuban Krasnodar – 2009–2012, 2014
 Dioh Williams – FC Alania Vladikavkaz – 2010

Lithuania
 Vytautas Apanavičius – FC Baltika Kaliningrad – 1997
 Giedrius Arlauskis – FC Rubin Kazan – 2010–2012
 Virginijus Baltušnikas – FC Lokomotiv Nizhny Novgorod – 1996–1997
 Nerijus Barasa – FC Krylia Sovetov Samara, FC Alania Vladikavkaz – 2001–2005
 Algimantas Briaunys – FC Asmaral Moscow – 1992
 Orestas Buitkus – FC Baltika Kaliningrad, FC Rubin Kazan – 1997–1998, 2005
 Fedor Černych – FC Dynamo Moscow, FC Orenburg – 2018–2020
 Deividas Česnauskis – FC Dynamo Moscow, FC Lokomotiv Moscow – 2000–2004
 Edgaras Česnauskis – FC Saturn Ramenskoye, FC Moscow, FC Dynamo Moscow, FC Rostov – 2006–2013
 Vidas Dančenka – FC Uralan Elista – 1999–2000
 Tomas Danilevičius – FC Dynamo Moscow – 1998
 Ignas Dedura – FC Torpedo-ZIL Moscow, FC Spartak Moscow – 2001, 2004–2009
 Rolandas Džiaukštas – FC Saturn Ramenskoye, FC Moscow – 2001–2007
 Artūras Fomenka – FC Rostselmash Rostov-on-Don – 2000–2002
 Andrius Gedgaudas – FC Tom Tomsk – 2005
 Tadas Gražiūnas – FC Rostselmash Rostov-on-Don, FC Torpedo-ZIL Moscow – 2000–2001
 Darius Gvildys – FC Lokomotiv Nizhny Novgorod – 1999
 Algis Jankauskas – FC Amkar Perm – 2004–2005
 Edgaras Jankauskas – PFC CSKA Moscow, FC Torpedo-Luzhniki Moscow – 1996–1997
 Andrius Jokšas – FC Krylia Sovetov Samara – 2000–2001
 Mindaugas Kalonas – FC Kuban Krasnodar – 2007
 Žydrūnas Karčemarskas – FC Dynamo Moscow – 2003–2008
 Igoris Kirilovas – FC KamAZ-Chally Naberezhnye Chelny – 1997
 Arūnas Klimavičius – FC Dynamo Moscow, FC Sibir Novosibirsk – 2007–2008, 2010
 Darius Maciulevičius – FC Alania Vladikavkaz – 1997
 Valdemaras Martinkėnas – FC KamAZ Naberezhnye Chelny – 1997
 Darius Miceika – FC Zenit St. Petersburg – 2002
 Saulius Mikalajūnas – FC Uralan Elista, FC Torpedo-ZIL Moscow – 1999–2002
 Tomas Mikuckis – FC Torpedo Moscow – 2015
 Viktoras Olšanskis – FC Baltika Kaliningrad – 1997
 Tadas Papečkys – FC Anzhi Makhachkala – 2002
 Vadimas Petrenko – FC Lokomotiv Nizhny Novgorod – 2000
 Eimantas Poderis – FC Alania Vladikavkaz – 1997
 Robertas Poškus – FC Krylia Sovetov Samara, FC Zenit St. Petersburg, FC Dynamo Moscow, FC Rostov – 2002–2007
 Aidas Preikšaitis – FC Torpedo-Luzhniki Moscow, FC KAMAZ-Chally Naberezhnye Chelny – 1997
 Nerijus Radžius – FC Chernomorets Novorossiysk – 2003
 Tomas Ražanauskas – FC Torpedo-Luzhniki Moscow, FC KAMAZ-Chally Naberezhnye Chelny – 1997
 Mantas Samusiovas – FC Torpedo Moscow, FC Khimki – 2003–2005, 2007–2008
 Darius Sanajevas – FC Alania Vladikavkaz – 1998
 Mantas Savėnas – FC Sibir Novosibirsk – 2010
 Deividas Šemberas – FC Dynamo Moscow, PFC CSKA Moscow, FC Alania Vladikavkaz– 1998–2013
 Darvydas Šernas – PFC Spartak Nalchik – 2008
 Andrius Skerla – FC Tom Tomsk – 2005–2006
 Audrius Šlekys – FC Alania Vladikavkaz – 1998
 Gintaras Staučė – FC Spartak Moscow – 1992–1994
 Irmantas Stumbrys – FC Zenit St. Petersburg – 1997
 Tomas Tamošauskas – FC Dynamo Moscow – 2003
 Valdas Trakys – FC Torpedo Moscow, FC Kuban Krasnodar – 2000, 2004
 Nerijus Vasiliauskas – FC Lokomotiv Nizhny Novgorod – 2000
 Andrius Velička – FC Anzhi Makhachkala – 2002
 Darius Žutautas – FC Alania Vladikavkaz, FC Dynamo Moscow – 1999–2002, 2005
 Giedrius Žutautas – FC KamAZ-Chally Naberezhnye Chelny – 1997
 Raimondas Žutautas – FC Alania Vladikavkaz – 1997–1999
 Rimantas Žvingilas – FC Torpedo Moscow – 2000

Luxembourg
 Christopher Martins – FC Spartak Moscow – 2022–2023
 Olivier Thill – FC Ufa – 2018–2020
 Sébastien Thill – FC Tambov – 2020

Malawi
 Essau Kanyenda – FC Rostov, FC Lokomotiv Moscow – 2003–2007

Mali
 Moussa Doumbia – FC Rostov, FC Arsenal Tula – 2014–2017
 Mamadou Maiga – FC Pari Nizhny Novgorod – 2022–2023 (acquired Russian citizenship in 2021}
 Moussa Sissako – PFC Sochi – 2022–2023
 Samba Sow – FC Dynamo Moscow – 2017–2019
 Dramane Traoré – FC Lokomotiv Moscow, FC Kuban Krasnodar – 2006–2010

Moldova
 Alexandru Antoniuc – FC Rubin Kazan – 2010–2011
 Igor Armaș – FC Kuban Krasnodar, FC Anzhi Makhachkala – 2011–2018
 Victor Berco – FC Shinnik Yaroslavl – 2002–2003
 Vitalie Bordian – FC Volga Nizhny Novgorod – 2013
 Simeon Bulgaru – FC Alania Vladikavkaz, FC Volga Nizhny Novgorod – 2010, 2012–2014
 Mihail Caimacov – FC Torpedo Moscow – 2022–2023
 Emil Caras – FC Tyumen – 1997
 Cătălin Carp – FC Ufa, FC Tambov – 2017–2021
 Valeriu Catînsus – FC Tom Tomsk – 2005–2009
 Ilie Cebanu – FC Tom Tomsk, FC Mordovia Saransk – 2013–2016
 Eugeniu Cebotaru – PFC Spartak Nalchik – 2012
 Valeriu Ciupercă – FC Krasnodar, FC Tom Tomsk, FC Rostov, FC Tambov – 2012, 2016–2020
 Serghei Cleșcenco – FC Zenit St. Petersburg, FC Chernomorets Novorossiysk – 1998, 2003
 Vasile Coșelev – FC Krylia Sovetov Samara, FC Uralan Elista – 1999–2000
 Alexandr Covalenco – FC Dynamo Moscow – 2002–2005
 Serghei Covalciuc – FC Spartak Moscow, FC Tom Tomsk – 2004–2010
 Alexandru Curtianu – FC Zenit St. Petersburg, FC Torpedo-ZIL Moscow – 1998–2000, 2002
 Sergiu Dadu – FC Alania Vladikavkaz, PFC CSKA Moscow – 2003–2005, 2010
 Dumitru Dolgov – FC Terek Grozny – 2008
 Alexandru Epureanu – FC Moscow, FC Dynamo Moscow, FC Krylia Sovetov Samara, FC Anzhi Makhachkala – 2007–2014
 Sergiu Epureanu – FC Sokol Saratov – 2002
 Viorel Frunză – PFC Spartak Nalchik – 2008
 Alexandru Gațcan – FC Rubin Kazan, FC Rostov, PFC Krylia Sovetov Samara – 2006–2007, 2009–2020
 Radu Gînsari – FC Krylia Sovetov Samara – 2019
 Victor Golovatenco – FC Khimki – 2007–2009
 Stanislav Ivanov – FC Moscow, FC Lokomotiv Moscow, FC Krylia Sovetov Samara, FC Rostov – 2004–2011
 Nicolae Josan – FC Anzhi Makhachkala – 2010
 Vladislav Lungu – FC Alania Vladikavkaz – 2005
 Vitali Maevici – FC Uralan Elista, FC Alania Vladikavkaz – 1999–2000
 Ivan Mandricenco – FC Kuban Krasnodar – 1992
 Stanislav Namașco – PFC Spartak Nalchik – 2011
 Ghenadie Olexici – FC Amkar Perm, FC Shinnik Yaroslavl – 2004–2006, 2008
 Victor Patrașco – FC Ufa – 2017
 Igor Picușceac – FC Krasnodar, FC Amkar Perm – 2011–2015
 Mihai Plătică – FC Rostov – 2015
 Alexandru Popovici – FC Dynamo Moscow – 1999
 Radu Rebeja – FC Uralan Elista, FC Saturn Ramenskoye, FC Moscow, FC Khimki – 1999–2008
 Serghei Rogaciov – FC Saturn Ramenskoye – 2000–2005
 Iurie Scala – FC Lada Togliatti – 1994
 Ștefan Sicaci – FC Terek Grozny – 2008
 Eugen Sidorenco – FC Tom Tomsk – 2013
 Oleg Șișchin – PFC CSKA Moscow, FC Saturn Ramenskoye, FC Tom Tomsk – 1999–2001, 2005–2006
 Adrian Sosnovschi – FC Saturn Ramenskoye, FC Chernomorets Novorossiysk – 1999–2003
 Dmitri Stajila – FC Kuban Krasnodar – 2016
 Gheorghe Stratulat – FC Alania Vladikavkaz – 2000–2001
 Alexandru Suharev – FC Alania Vladikavkaz – 1997
 Mihail Tcaciuk – FC KamAZ-Chally Naberezhnye Chelny – 1996
 Boris Tropaneț – FC KamAZ Naberezhnye Chelny – 1993–1997

Montenegro
 Marko Baša – FC Lokomotiv Moscow – 2008–2011
 Radoslav Batak – FC Dynamo Moscow – 2003–2005
 Fatos Bećiraj – FC Dynamo Moscow – 2016–2017
 Mladen Božović – FC Tom Tomsk – 2013
 Vladimir Božović – FC Mordovia Saransk – 2013–2015
 Radosav Bulić – FC Rubin Kazan – 2004
 Zaim Divanović – FC Akhmat Grozny – 2023
 Radomir Đalović – FC Amkar Perm – 2011–2012
 Luka Đorđević – FC Zenit St. Petersburg, FC Arsenal Tula, FC Lokomotiv Moscow, PFC Sochi – 2012–2013, 2016–2023
 Nikola Drinčić – FC Amkar Perm, FC Spartak Moscow, FC Krasnodar – 2007–2013
 Miodrag Džudović – PFC Spartak Nalchik – 2006–2012
 Sead Hakšabanović – FC Rubin Kazan – 2021–2022
 Milan Jovanović – PFC Spartak Nalchik – 2010–2011
 Mladen Kašćelan – FC Arsenal Tula, FC Tosno – 2014–2015, 2017
 Dušan Lagator – PFC Sochi – 2019–2020
 Vojvoda Malesija – FC Uralan Elista – 2000
 Nemanja Mijušković – FC Tosno – 2018
 Bogdan Milić – PFC Spartak Nalchik – 2011
 Mitar Novaković – FC Amkar Perm – 2008–2013
 Marko Obradović – FC Yenisey Krasnoyarsk – 2018
 Rade Petrović – FC Terek Grozny – 2008
 Marko Rakonjac – FC Lokomotiv Moscow – 2022
 Bojan Roganović – FC Torpedo Moscow – 2022–2023
 Marko Simić – FC Rostov – 2017
 Jovan Tanasijević – FC Dynamo Moscow, FC Rostov – 2003–2009
 Vladimir Vujović – FC Luch-Energiya Vladivostok – 2008
 Simon Vukčević – FC Saturn Ramenskoye – 2006–2007
 Miodrag Zec – FC Alania Vladikavkaz – 2004

Morocco
 Ismaïl Aissati – FC Terek Grozny – 2013–2016
 Abdelillah Bagui – FC Spartak Moscow, FC Rostov – 2003, 2005–2006
 Mustapha Bidoudane – FC Rostov – 2005
 Mbark Boussoufa – FC Anzhi Makhachkala, FC Lokomotiv Moscow – 2011–2015
 Mehdi Carcela – FC Anzhi Makhachkala – 2011–2013
 Manuel da Costa – FC Lokomotiv Moscow – 2011–2012
 Khalid Fouhami – FC Alania Vladikavkaz – 2004
 Abdelkarim Kissi – FC Rubin Kazan – 2003–2004
 Noureddine Ziyati – FC Amkar Perm – 2004–2006

Netherlands
 Otman Bakkal – FC Dynamo Moscow – 2012
 Glenn Bijl – PFC Krylia Sovetov Samara – 2021–2023
 Alexander Büttner – FC Dynamo Moscow – 2014–2015
 Romeo Castelen – FC Volga Nizhny Novgorod – 2013
 Demy de Zeeuw – FC Spartak Moscow – 2011–2012
 Douglas – FC Dynamo Moscow – 2013–2015
 Royston Drenthe – FC Alania Vladikavkaz – 2013
 Lorenzo Ebecilio – FC Mordovia Saransk, FC Anzhi Makhachkala – 2014–2016
 Jorrit Hendrix – FC Spartak Moscow – 2021
 Othman El Kabir – FC Ural Yekaterinburg – 2018–2021
 Gyrano Kerk – FC Lokomotiv Moscow – 2021–2022
 Gianluca Nijholt – FC Amkar Perm – 2012–2014
 Quincy Promes – FC Spartak Moscow – 2014–2018, 2021–2023
 Fernando Ricksen – FC Zenit St. Petersburg – 2006–2008
 Guus Til – FC Spartak Moscow – 2019–2020
 Tonny Vilhena – FC Krasnodar – 2019–2021
 Rai Vloet – FC Ural Yekaterinburg – 2022–2023

Niger
 Moussa Maâzou – PFC CSKA Moscow – 2009
 Amadou Moutari – FC Anzhi Makhachkala – 2015–2016

Nigeria
 Dele Adeleye – FC Anzhi Makhachkala, FC SKA-Khabarovsk – 2013, 2018
 Abdulwaheed Afolabi – FC Kuban Krasnodar – 2012
 Haruna Babangida – FC Kuban Krasnodar – 2009
 Benito – FC Tambov – 2019
 Justice Christopher – FC Alania Vladikavkaz – 2005
 Moses Cobnan – FC Krasnodar – 2023
 Babajide Collins Babatunde – FC Alania Vladikavkaz – 2010
 Bright Dike – FC Amkar Perm – 2016
 Augustine Eguavoen – FC Torpedo Moscow – 1997–1998
 Chidera Ejuke – PFC CSKA Moscow – 2020–2022
 Isah Eliakwu – FC Anzhi Makhachkala – 2011
 Emmanuel Emenike – FC Spartak Moscow – 2011–2013
 Joseph Enakarhire – FC Dynamo Moscow – 2005
 Richard Eromoigbe – FC Khimki – 2008
 Okon Flo Essien – FC Spartak Moscow – 2001–2003
 Kehinde Fatai – FC Ufa – 2016–2018
 Idriss Harouna – FC Rostselmash Rostov-on-Don – 2001
 Lukman Haruna – FC Anzhi Makhachkala – 2015
 Ezekiel Henty – FC Lokomotiv Moscow – 2016
 Brian Idowu – FC Amkar Perm, FC Lokomotiv Moscow, FC Khimki – 2012, 2014–2023
 Sylvester Igboun – FC Ufa, FC Dynamo Moscow, FC Nizhny Novgorod – 2015–2022
 Lucky Isibor – FC Dynamo Moscow – 1998–2000
 Sani Kaita – FC Kuban Krasnodar, FC Lokomotiv Moscow, FC Alania Vladikavkaz – 2009–2010
 Obafemi Martins – FC Rubin Kazan – 2010–2012
 Jerry Mbakogu – FC Krylia Sovetov Samara – 2016
 Victor Moses – FC Spartak Moscow – 2020–2022
 Ahmed Musa – PFC CSKA Moscow – 2012–2016, 2018
 Lawrence Nicholas – FC Tambov, FC Khimki – 2020, 2022
 Victor Obinna – FC Lokomotiv Moscow – 2011–2013
 James Obiorah – FC Lokomotiv Moscow – 2001–2002, 2004
 Peter Odemwingie – FC Lokomotiv Moscow – 2007–2010
 Chidi Odiah – PFC CSKA Moscow – 2004–2011
 Fegor Ogude – FC Amkar Perm, FC Yenisey Krasnoyarsk – 2014–2019
 Samuel Ogunsania – FC Spartak Moscow – 2002
 Emmanuel Okoduwa – FC Kuban Krasnodar – 2007, 2009
 Isaac Okoronkwo – FC Alania Vladikavkaz, FC Moscow, FC Rostov – 2005–2013
 Jonathan Okoronkwo – FC Krasnodar – 2022
 Solomon Okoronkwo – FC Saturn Ramenskoye – 2008–2009
 Aaron Samuel Olanare – PFC CSKA Moscow, FC Amkar Perm – 2016–2018
 Olakunle Olusegun – FC Krasnodar – 2022–2023
 Patrick Ovie – FC Krylia Sovetov Samara, FC Dynamo Moscow – 2002–2006
 Omonigho Temile – FC Krylia Sovetov Samara – 2004–2006
 Duke Udi – FC Krylia Sovetov Samara – 2002
 Louis Udoh – FC Chernomorets Novorossiysk – 2001
 Mohammed Usman – FC Tambov – 2019
 Izunna Uzochukwu – FC Amkar Perm – 2015

North Korea
 Choe Myong-ho – FC Krylia Sovetov Samara – 2008
 Hong Yong-jo – FC Rostov – 2009–2010

North Macedonia
 Fikret Alomerović – FC Torpedo-Luzhniki Moscow – 1997
 Dragan Čadikovski – FC Zenit St. Petersburg – 2005
 Goran Dimovski – FC Terek Grozny – 2008
 Nikola Gjoševski – FC Spartak Moscow – 2001
 Adis Jahović – FC Krylia Sovetov Samara – 2015–2016
 Nikola Karčev – FC Terek Grozny – 2008
 Igor Kralevski – FC Luch-Energiya Vladivostok – 2007–2008
 Goran Maznov – FC Torpedo-ZIL Moscow, FC Tom Tomsk – 2002, 2007–2010
 Igor Mitreski – FC Spartak Moscow – 2001–2004
 Stevica Ristić – FC Amkar Perm – 2010–2011
 Marko Simonovski – FC Amkar Perm – 2014
 Igor Stamenovski – FC Spartak Moscow – 2001
 Veliče Šumulikoski – FC Zenit St. Petersburg, FC Sibir Novosibirsk – 2004–2006, 2010
 David Toshevski – FC Rostov – 2020

Norway
 Haitam Aleesami – FC Rostov – 2020–2021
 Chuma Anene – FC Amkar Perm – 2015–2017
 Emil Bohinen – PFC CSKA Moscow – 2021
 Erik Hagen – FC Zenit St. Petersburg – 2005–2007
 Jørgen Jalland – FC Rubin Kazan – 2005–2006
 Magnus Nordengen Knudsen – FC Rostov – 2022
 Lars Olden Larsen – FC Nizhny Novgorod – 2022
 Mathias Normann – FC Rostov, FC Dynamo Moscow – 2019–2023
 Stefan Strandberg – FC Krasnodar, FC Ural Yekaterinburg – 2015–2016, 2019–2021

Panama
 Alberto Blanco – FC Alania Vladikavkaz – 2005

Paraguay
 Diego Acosta – FC Orenburg – 2022
 Júnior Alonso – FC Krasnodar – 2023
 Fabián Balbuena – FC Dynamo Moscow – 2021–2022
 Fredy Bareiro – FC Saturn Ramenskoye – 2005–2006
 Lucas Barrios – FC Spartak Moscow – 2013–2014
 Luis Nery Caballero – FC Krylia Sovetov Samara – 2012–2014}
 Óscar Díaz – FC Saturn Ramenskoye, FC Rubin Kazan – 2004–2005
 Alexis Duarte – FC Spartak Moscow – 2023
 Roberto Fernández – FC Dynamo Moscow – 2022–2023
 Jesús Medina – PFC CSKA Moscow – 2022–2023
 Lorenzo Melgarejo – FC Kuban Krasnodar, FC Spartak Moscow – 2013–2020
 Nelson Valdez – FC Rubin Kazan – 2011–2012
 Pablo Zeballos – FC Krylia Sovetov Samara – 2012

Peru
 Rivelino Carassa – FC Alania Vladikavkaz – 2003–2004
 Christian Cueva – FC Krasnodar – 2018
 Jefferson Farfán – FC Lokomotiv Moscow – 2017–2020
 Martín Hidalgo – FC Saturn Ramenskoye – 2003, 2005
 Andrés Mendoza – FC Dynamo Moscow – 2006
 Yordy Reyna – FC Torpedo Moscow – 2023
 Carlos Zambrano – FC Rubin Kazan – 2016–2017

Poland
 Rafał Augustyniak – FC Ural Yekaterinburg – 2019–2022
 Ariel Borysiuk – FC Volga Nizhny Novgorod – 2014
 Janusz Gol – FC Amkar Perm – 2013–2018
 Damian Gorawski – FC Moscow, FC Shinnik Yaroslavl – 2005–2008
 Bartłomiej Grzelak – FC Sibir Novosibirsk – 2010
 Dawid Janczyk – PFC CSKA Moscow – 2007–2008
 Artur Jędrzejczyk – FC Krasnodar – 2013–2016
 Mariusz Jop – FC Moscow – 2004–2009
 Adam Kokoszka – FC Torpedo Moscow – 2014–2015
 Marcin Komorowski – FC Terek Grozny – 2012–2015
 Marcin Kowalczyk – FC Dynamo Moscow, FC Volga Nizhny Novgorod – 2008–2010, 2013–2014
 Wojciech Kowalewski – FC Spartak Moscow, FC Sibir Novosibirsk  – 2003–2006, 2010
 Grzegorz Krychowiak – FC Lokomotiv Moscow, FC Krasnodar – 2018–2021
 Michał Kucharczyk – FC Ural Yekaterinburg – 2019–2020
 Marcin Kuś – FC Torpedo Moscow – 2006
 Krzysztof Łągiewka – FC Shinnik Yaroslavl, FC Krylia Sovetov Samara, FC Kuban Krasnodar – 2004–2009
 Maciej Makuszewski – FC Terek Grozny – 2012–2013
 Konrad Michalak – FC Akhmat Grozny – 2019
 Rafał Murawski – FC Rubin Kazan – 2009–2010
 Grzegorz Piechna – FC Torpedo Moscow – 2006
 Piotr Polczak – FC Terek Grozny, FC Volga Nizhny Novgorod – 2011–2014
 Maciej Rybus – FC Terek Grozny, FC Lokomotiv Moscow, FC Spartak Moscow – 2012–2022
 Łukasz Sekulski – FC SKA-Khabarovsk – 2018
 Damian Szymański – FC Akhmat Grozny – 2019
 Sebastian Szymański – FC Dynamo Moscow – 2019–2022
 Jarosław Tkocz – FC Shinnik Yaroslavl – 2004
 Jakub Wawrzyniak – FC Amkar Perm – 2014
 Maciej Wilusz – FC Rostov, FC Ural Yekaterinburg – 2017–2018, 2020
 Damian Zbozień – FC Amkar Perm – 2014

Portugal

 Márcio Abreu – FC Krasnodar – 2011–2014
 Hugo Almeida – FC Kuban Krasnodar, FC Anzhi Makhachkala – 2015
 Bruno Alves – FC Zenit St. Petersburg – 2010–2013
 Ricardo Alves – FC Orenburg – 2018–2020
 Bruno Basto – FC Shinnik Yaroslavl – 2008
 Miguel Cardoso – FC Dynamo Moscow, FC Tambov – 2018–2020
 Costinha – FC Dynamo Moscow – 2005
 Custódio – FC Dynamo Moscow – 2007
 Danny – FC Dynamo Moscow, FC Zenit St. Petersburg – 2005–2017
 Yannick Djaló – FC Mordovia Saransk – 2015
 Eder – FC Lokomotiv Moscow – 2017–2021
 Fábio Felício – FC Rubin Kazan – 2007
 Manuel Fernandes – FC Lokomotiv Moscow, FC Krasnodar – 2014–2020
 Nuno Frechaut – FC Dynamo Moscow – 2005
 Luís Loureiro – FC Dynamo Moscow – 2005
 Maniche – FC Dynamo Moscow – 2005
 João Mário – FC Lokomotiv Moscow – 2019–2020
 Fernando Meira – FC Zenit St. Petersburg – 2009–2011
 Rui Miguel – FC Krasnodar – 2011
 Luís Neto – FC Zenit St. Petersburg – 2013–2019
 Nuno – FC Dynamo Moscow – 2005
 Jorge Ribeiro – FC Dynamo Moscow – 2005
 Tiago Rodrigues – FC Ufa – 2022
 Ricardo Silva – FC Shinnik Yaroslavl – 2008
 Tomás Tavares – FC Spartak Moscow – 2023
 Hugo Vieira – FC Torpedo Moscow – 2014–2015

Romania
 Marian Alexandru – FC Alania Vladikavkaz – 2001
 Paul Anton – FC Anzhi Makhachkala, FC Krylia Sovetov Samara – 2018–2020
 Iulian Arhire – FC Alania Vladikavkaz – 2000
 Cosmin Bărcăuan – FC Krylia Sovetov Samara – 2005
 Eric Bicfalvi – FC Tom Tomsk, FC Ural Sverdlovsk Oblast – 2016–2023
 Valeriu Bordeanu – FC Kuban Krasnodar – 2004
 Alexandru Bourceanu – FC Arsenal Tula – 2017
 Marius Bratu – FC Uralan Elista – 2002
 Gheorghe Bucur – FC Kuban Krasnodar – 2011–2016
 Zeno Bundea – FC Zenit St. Petersburg – 2002
 Daniel Chiriță – FC Zenit St. Petersburg – 2002–2004
 Răzvan Cociș – FC Lokomotiv Moscow, FC Rostov – 2007–2009, 2011–2013
 Florin Costea – FC Arsenal Tula – 2015
 Ovidiu Dănănae – FC Tom Tomsk – 2011
 Cristian Dancia – FC Torpedo Moscow – 2004–2006
 Iulian Dăniță – FC Chernomorets Novorossiysk – 2003
 Mihai Drăguș – FC Torpedo Moscow, FC Lokomotiv Nizhny Novgorod – 1999–2000
 Gabriel Enache – FC Rubin Kazan – 2018
 George Florescu – FC Torpedo Moscow, FC Alania Vladikavkaz, FC Dynamo Moscow – 2006, 2010, 2013–2014
 Sorin Ghionea – FC Rostov – 2010
 Gabriel Giurgiu – FC Rubin Kazan – 2007
 Nicolae Grigore – FC Alania Vladikavkaz – 2001–2003
 Gheorghe Grozav – FC Terek Grozny – 2013–2017
 Gabriel Iancu – FC Akhmat Grozny – 2021
 Adrian Iencsi – FC Spartak Moscow – 2004–2006
 Adrian Iordache – FC Shinnik Yaroslavl – 2006
 Andrei Ivan – FC Krasnodar – 2017–2018
 Erik Lincar – FC Amkar Perm – 2004–2006
 Andrei Mărgăritescu – FC Terek Grozny – 2008–2009
 Ioan Mera – FC Alania Vladikavkaz – 2012
 Damian Militaru – FC Shinnik Yaroslavl – 1999
 Florinel Mirea – FC Alania Vladikavkaz – 2000–2001
 Andrei Mureșan – FC Kuban Krasnodar – 2009
 Gabriel Mureșan – FC Tom Tomsk – 2013–2014
 Ionuț Nedelcearu – FC Ufa – 2018–2020
 Daniel Niculae – FC Kuban Krasnodar – 2012–2013
 Norbert Niță – FC Uralan Elista – 2002
 Daniel Oprița – FC Mordovia Saransk – 2013
 Daniel Pancu – FC Terek Grozny – 2008–2009
 Ionel Pârvu – FC Chernomorets Novorossiysk – 2003
 Florentin Petre – FC Terek Grozny – 2008–2009
 Mihăiță Pleșan – FC Volga Nizhny Novgorod – 2011–2013
 Andrei Prepeliță – FC Rostov – 2016–2017
 Adrian Ropotan – FC Dynamo Moscow, FC Tom Tomsk, FC Volga Nizhny Novgorod – 2009–2014
 Florin Costin Șoavă – FC Spartak Moscow, FC Krylia Sovetov Samara, FC Khimki – 2004–2008
 Nicolae Stanciu – FC Anzhi Makhachkala – 2002
 Pompiliu Stoica – FC Moscow, FC Tom Tomsk – 2004–2008
 János Székely – FC Volga Nizhny Novgorod – 2011
 Gabriel Tamaș – FC Spartak Moscow – 2004, 2006
 Iulian Tameș – FC Alania Vladikavkaz – 2005
 Gabriel Torje – FC Terek Grozny – 2016–2017
 Cristian Tudor – FC Alania Vladikavkaz, FC Moscow – 2003–2005
 Alexandru Tudorie – FC Arsenal Tula – 2019, 2021
 Dacian Varga – FC Kuban Krasnodar – 2011

Rwanda
 Gerard Gohou – FC Krasnodar – 2013

Scotland
 Garry O'Connor – FC Lokomotiv Moscow – 2006–2007

Senegal
 Ibrahima Baldé – FC Kuban Krasnodar – 2012–2016
 Keita Baldé – FC Spartak Moscow – 2022–2023
 Baye Djiby Fall – FC Lokomotiv Moscow – 2009, 2011
 Marcel Gomis – FC Shinnik Yaroslavl – 2008
 Papa Gueye – FC Rostov – 2016
 Ibra Kébé – FC Spartak Moscow, FC Anzhi Makhachkala – 2001–2004, 2010–2011
 Pape Maguette Kebe – FC Rubin Kazan – 2003
 Moussa Konaté – FC Krasnodar – 2012–2013
 Ablaye Mbengue – FC Akhmat Grozny – 2015–2020
 Pascal Mendy – FC Dynamo Moscow – 2003–2006
 Baye Gueye Ndiaga – FC Rubin Kazan – 2003
 Ibrahima Niasse – FC Mordovia Saransk – 2014–2015
 Oumar Niasse – FC Lokomotiv Moscow – 2014–2015
 Dame N'Doye – FC Lokomotiv Moscow – 2012–2014
 Babacar Sarr – FC Yenisey Krasnoyarsk – 2019
 Mamadou Sylla – FC Orenburg – 2020
 Khaly Thiam – FC Dynamo Moscow – 2017
 Pape Thiaw – FC Dynamo Moscow – 2002

Serbia
 Predrag Alempijević – FC Uralan Elista – 2000
 Dušan Anđelković – FC Rostov, FC Krasnodar – 2009–2013
 Komnen Andrić – FC Ufa – 2020–2021
 Nikola Antić – FC Khimki – 2023
 Mihajlo Banjac – FC Krasnodar – 2022–2023
 Stevan Bates – FC Alania Vladikavkaz – 2004
 Nenad Begović – FC Luch-Energiya Vladivostok – 2008
 Marko Blažić – FC Amkar Perm – 2011–2012
 Miroslav Bogosavac – FC Akhmat Grozny – 2020–2022
 Vidak Bratić – FC Dynamo Moscow – 2003–2004
 Goran Čaušić – FC Arsenal Tula – 2017–2022
 Aleksandar Ćirković – PFC Krylia Sovetov Samara – 2022–2023
 Nenad Ćirković – FC Uralan Elista – 2000
 Vladica Ćurčić – FC Alania Vladikavkaz – 2000
 Ivan Cvetković – FC Khimki – 2009
 Nikola Damjanac – FC Saturn-RenTV Ramenskoye – 2002
 Đorđe Despotović – FC Orenburg, FC Rubin Kazan, FC Arsenal Tula – 2018–2022
 Dominik Dinga – FC Ural Sverdlovsk Oblast – 2016–2018
 Nenad Đorđević – FC Krylia Sovetov Samara – 2010–2011
 Slavoljub Đorđević – FC Alania Vladikavkaz, FC Shinnik Yaroslavl – 2005, 2008
 Rade Dugalić – FC Tosno, FC Yenisey Krasnoyarsk – 2017–2018
 Milan Gajić – PFC CSKA Moscow – 2022–2023
 Nemanja Glavčić – FC Khimki – 2022–2023
 Stevo Glogovac – FC Anzhi Makhachkala – 2002
 Jovan Golić – PFC Spartak Nalchik – 2010–2012
 Petar Golubović – FC Khimki – 2023
 Nenad Injac – FC Amkar Perm – 2008
 Branislav Ivanović – FC Lokomotiv Moscow, FC Zenit St. Petersburg – 2006–2007, 2017–2020
 Nebojša Jelenković – FC Kuban Krasnodar – 2007
 Ivan Jević – FC Spartak-Alania Vladikavkaz – 2003
 Đorđe Jokić – FC Torpedo Moscow, FC Tom Tomsk – 2005–2006, 2008–2011
 Nikola Jolović – FC Torpedo Moscow, FC Saturn Ramenskoye – 2001–2005
 Goran Jovanović – FC Anzhi Makhachkala – 2001
 Milan Jovanović – FC Lokomotiv Moscow – 2004
 Miodrag Jovanović – FC Chernomorets Novorossiysk, FC Khimki – 2000, 2007–2009
 Milan Jović – FC Spartak Moscow, FC Chernomorets Novorossiysk, FC Rostselmash Rostov-on-Don, FC Saturn-RenTV Ramenskoye – 2000–2003
 Branko Jovičić – FC Amkar Perm, FC Ural Yekaterinburg – 2014–2017, 2020–2021
 Mateja Kežman – FC Zenit St. Petersburg – 2009
 Zoran Knežević – FC Khimki – 2008
 Aleksandar Komadina – FC Torpedo-ZIL Moscow – 2002–2003
 Ognjen Koroman – FC Dynamo Moscow, FC Krylia Sovetov Samara, FC Terek Grozny – 2002–2005, 2011
 Zoran Kostić – FC Shinnik Yaroslavl – 2006
 Miloš Krasić – PFC CSKA Moscow – 2004–2010
 Miloš Kruščić – FC Rostov – 2001–2007
 Jovica Lakić – FC Torpedo Moscow, FC Torpedo-ZIL Moscow – 2001–2002
 Ognjen Lakić – FC Krylia Sovetov Samara – 2000
 Darko Lazić – FC Anzhi Makhachkala – 2015–2016
 Danko Lazović – FC Zenit St. Petersburg, FC Rostov – 2010–2013
 Milan Lešnjak – FC Saturn Ramenskoye – 2003–2005
 Marko Lomić – FC Dynamo Moscow, FC Mordovia Saransk – 2010–2016
 Aleksandar Luković – FC Zenit St. Petersburg – 2010–2013
 Milan Majstorović – FC Dynamo Moscow – 2023
 Nikola Maksimović – FC Spartak Moscow – 2018
 Miroslav Marković – FC SKA-Khabarovsk – 2017–2018
 Stefan Melentijević – FC Khimki – 2023
 Nikola Mijailović – FC Khimki, FC Amkar Perm – 2008, 2011–2013
 Srđan Mijailović – FC Krylia Sovetov Samara – 2017–2020
 Predrag Mijić – FC Amkar Perm – 2011–2012
 Ivan Miladinović – PFC Sochi, FC Nizhny Novgorod – 2019–2022
 Draško Milekić – FC Uralan Elista – 2000
 Nemanja Miletić – FC Ufa – 2021
 Aleksandar Miljković – FC Amkar Perm – 2016–2018
 Savo Milošević – FC Rubin Kazan – 2008
 Marko Milovanović – FC Amkar Perm – 2007–2008
 Dragan Mrđa – FC Khimki – 2007–2008
 Vladimir Mudrinić – FC Zenit St. Petersburg – 2002
 Albert Nađ – FC Rostov – 2007
 Nenad Nastić – FC Khimki – 2009
 Nemanja Nikolić – FC Rostov – 2013–2014
 Ratko Nikolić – FC Anzhi Makhachkala – 2001
 Rade Novković – FC Luch-Energiya Vladivostok – 2007–2008
 Milan Obradović – FC Lokomotiv Moscow – 2001–2003
 Ognjen Ožegović – FC Arsenal Tula – 2018–2019
 Radovan Pankov – FC Ural Sverdlovsk Oblast – 2016–2017
 Veljko Paunović – FC Rubin Kazan – 2007
 Nemanja Pejčinović – FC Lokomotiv Moscow – 2014–2018
 Mitar Peković – FC Anzhi Makhachkala – 2010
 Milan Perendija – FC Mordovia Saransk – 2013–2016
 Dušan Petković – FC Spartak Moscow, FC Saturn Ramenskoye – 2004, 2006–2007
 Marko Petković – FC Spartak Moscow – 2017–2018
 Nikola Petković – FC Tom Tomsk – 2010
 Aleksandar R. Petrović – FC Shinnik Yaroslavl – 2008
 Boško Petrović – FC Alania Vladikavkaz – 2001
 Branimir Petrović – FC Rubin Kazan, FC Rostov, FC Krylia Sovetov Samara – 2007, 2009–2010
 Mihajlo Pjanović – FC Spartak Moscow, FC Rostov – 2003–2007
 Marko Poletanović – FC Tosno – 2017–2018
 Uroš Radaković – FC Orenburg, FC Arsenal Tula – 2019–2022
 Dejan Radić – FC Alania Vladikavkaz, PFC Spartak Nalchik, FC Rostov – 2004–2005, 2007–2011
 Milan Radojičić – FC Torpedo-ZIL Moscow – 2001
 Slobodan Rajković – FC Lokomotiv Moscow – 2020
 Lazar Ranđelović – FC Ural Yekaterinburg – 2022–2023
 Predrag Ranđelović – FC Anzhi Makhachkala, PFC CSKA Moscow, FC Zenit St. Petersburg – 2000–2003
 Vuk Rašović – FC Krylia Sovetov Samara – 2002
 Mihailo Ristić – FC Krasnodar – 2017
 Milan Rodić – FC Zenit St. Petersburg, FC Volga Nizhny Novgorod, FC Krylia Sovetov Samara – 2013–2017
 Sead Salahović – FC Alania Vladikavkaz – 2000
 Stefan Šapić – FC Torpedo Moscow – 2022
 Srđan Savičević – FC Uralan Elista – 2000
 Marko Šćepović – FC Terek Grozny – 2015
 Predrag Sikimić – FC Amkar Perm – 2007–2009
 Aleksandar Simčević – FC Mordovia Saransk – 2012
 Petar Škuletić – FC Lokomotiv Moscow – 2015–2016
 Nenad Šljivić – FC Rostov – 2009
 Uroš Spajić – FC Krasnodar – 2018–2019, 2021
 Goran Sretenović – FC Uralan Elista – 2000
 Sreten Sretenović – FC Kuban Krasnodar – 2009
 Srđan Stanić – FC Spartak Moscow – 2003
 Nenad Stojanović – FC Luch-Energiya Vladivostok – 2007
 Dejan Stojković – FC Uralan Elista – 2000
 Nebojša Stojković – FC Anzhi Makhachkala – 2000–2002
 Zoran Tošić – PFC CSKA Moscow – 2010–2017
 Goran Trobok – FC Spartak Moscow – 2003–2004
 Nikola Trujić – FC Tosno – 2017–2018
 Nemanja Tubić – FC Krasnodar, FC SKA-Khabarovsk – 2011–2013, 2018
 Nikola Valentić – FC Sibir Novosibirsk – 2010
 Radojica Vasić – FC Uralan Elista – 2000
 Nemanja Vidić – FC Spartak Moscow – 2004–2005
 Milan Vještica – FC Zenit St. Petersburg, FC Rostov, FC Shinnik Yaroslavl, FC Ural Sverdlovsk Oblast – 2002–2008, 2013
 Mićo Vranješ – FC Uralan Elista – 2003
 Nemanja Vučićević – FC Lokomotiv Moscow – 2001–2003
 Vanja Vučićević – PFC Krylia Sovetov Samara – 2019
 Zvonimir Vukić – FC Moscow – 2008–2009
 Ivan Vukomanović – FC Dynamo Moscow – 2002–2003
 Saša Zdjelar – PFC CSKA Moscow – 2022–2023
 Ivan Živanović – FC Rostov – 2009–2011

Sierra Leone
 Mohamed Camara – FC Fakel Voronezh – 2001

Slovakia
 Ladislav Almási – FC Akhmat Grozny – 2021
 Marek Bakoš – FC Shinnik Yaroslavl – 2006
 Michal Breznaník – FC Amkar Perm – 2012–2013
 Kamil Čontofalský – FC Zenit St. Petersburg – 2003–2007, 2009
 Juraj Dovičovič – FC Lokomotiv Moscow – 2000
 Ján Ďurica – FC Saturn Ramenskoye, FC Lokomotiv Moscow – 2006–2016
 Michal Ďuriš – FC Orenburg – 2017
 Branislav Fodrek – FC Saturn Ramenskoye – 2006
 Norbert Gyömbér – FC Terek Grozny – 2017
 Marián Had – FC Lokomotiv Moscow – 2006–2007
 Michal Hanek – FC Dynamo Moscow – 2003–2005
 Richard Höger – FC Lokomotiv Nizhny Novgorod – 1999
 Marek Hollý – FC Lokomotiv Nizhny Novgorod, PFC CSKA Moscow, FC Alania Vladikavkaz, FC Anzhi Makhachkala – 1999–2001
 Zsolt Hornyák – FC Dynamo Moscow – 2001–2002
 Tomáš Hubočan – FC Zenit St. Petersburg, FC Dynamo Moscow – 2008–2016
 Martin Jakubko – FC Saturn Ramenskoye, FC Khimki, FC Moscow, FC Dynamo Moscow, FC Amkar Perm – 2006–2010, 2012–2015
 Kamil Kopúnek – FC Saturn Moscow Oblast – 2010
 František Kubík – FC Kuban Krasnodar – 2011
 Róbert Mak – FC Zenit St. Petersburg – 2016–2019
 Ján Mucha – FC Krylia Sovetov Samara, FC Arsenal Tula – 2013–2015
 Branislav Obžera – FC Saturn Ramenskoye – 2006
 Pavol Pavlus – FC Chernomorets Novorossiysk – 2001
 Peter Petráš – FC Saturn Ramenskoye – 2006–2008
 Kornel Saláta – FC Rostov, FC Tom Tomsk – 2011–2014
 Martin Škrtel – FC Zenit St. Petersburg – 2004–2007
 Lukáš Tesák – FC Torpedo Moscow, FC Arsenal Tula – 2014–2016
 Radoslav Zabavník – FC Terek Grozny – 2008–2009

Slovenia
 Gregor Balažic – FC Ural Sverdlovsk Oblast – 2017–2018
 Jaka Bijol – PFC CSKA Moscow – 2018–2022
 Lovro Bizjak – FC Ufa – 2018–2020
 Matija Boben – FC Rostov – 2017–2018
 Nastja Čeh – FC Khimki – 2007–2008
 Vanja Drkušić – PFC Sochi – 2022–2023
 Suad Fileković – FC Krylia Sovetov Samara – 2006–2007
 Goran Gutalj – PFC CSKA Moscow – 1999
 Denis Halilović – FC Saturn Moscow Oblast – 2009–2010
 Branko Ilić – FC Moscow, FC Lokomotiv Moscow – 2009–2011
 Dragan Jelić – FC Krylia Sovetov Samara – 2010
 Bojan Jokić – FC Ufa – 2017–2022
 Amir Karić – FC Moscow – 2004
 Miha Kline – FC Shinnik Yaroslavl – 2006
 Igor Lazič – FC Terek Grozny – 2005
 Žan Majer – FC Rostov – 2017–2018
 Darijan Matić – FC Shinnik Yaroslavl, PFC Spartak Nalchik – 2006–2007
 Miha Mevlja – FC Rostov, FC Zenit St. Petersburg, PFC Sochi, FC Spartak Moscow – 2016–2022
 Nejc Pečnik – FC Krylia Sovetov Samara – 2011
 Jalen Pokorn – FC Terek Grozny – 2005
 Denis Popović – FC Orenburg, FC Krylia Sovetov Samara – 2017–2020
 Aleksandar Radosavljević – FC Shinnik Yaroslavl, FC Tom Tomsk – 2002, 2004–2009
 Dejan Rusič – PFC Spartak Nalchik – 2010
 Miral Samardžić – FC Anzhi Makhachkala, FC Krylia Sovetov Samara – 2017–2019
 Žiga Škoflek – FC Orenburg – 2019–2020
 Dalibor Stevanović – FC Torpedo Moscow, FC Mordovia Saransk – 2014–2016
 Dušan Stojinović – FC Khimki – 2021
 Dalibor Volaš – FC Mordovia Saransk – 2012–2013
 Andrés Vombergar – FC Ufa – 2019–2020
 Luka Žinko – FC Amkar Perm – 2010

South Africa
 Matthew Booth – FC Rostov, FC Krylia Sovetov Samara – 2002–2008
 Tony Coyle – FC Rostov – 2003–2005
 Stanton Fredericks – FC Moscow – 2004–2005
 Rowan Hendricks – FC Rostov – 2003–2005
 Jacob Lekgetho – FC Lokomotiv Moscow – 2001–2004
 Bennett Mnguni – FC Lokomotiv Moscow, FC Rostov – 2002–2005
 Dillon Sheppard – FC Dynamo Moscow – 2004
 MacBeth Sibaya – FC Rubin Kazan – 2003–2010
 Siyanda Xulu – FC Rostov – 2012–2014
 Japhet Zwane – FC Rostov – 2003–2005

South Korea
 Hwang In-beom – FC Rubin Kazan – 2020–2021
 Hyun Young-min – FC Zenit St. Petersburg – 2006
 Kim Dong-hyun – FC Rubin Kazan – 2006
 Kim Dong-jin – FC Zenit St. Petersburg – 2006–2009
 Kim In-sung – PFC CSKA Moscow – 2012
 Kim Nam-il – FC Tom Tomsk – 2010–2011
 Denis Laktionov – FC Tom Tomsk – 2011
 Lee Ho – FC Zenit St. Petersburg – 2006
 Oh Beom-seok – FC Krylia Sovetov Samara – 2008–2009
 Yoo Byung-soo – FC Rostov – 2013–2015

Spain
 Víctor Álvarez – FC Arsenal Tula – 2017–2020
 Catanha – FC Krylia Sovetov Samara – 2004
 Chico – FC Rubin Kazan – 2018
 Marc Crosas – FC Volga Nizhny Novgorod – 2011
 Ángel Dealbert – FC Kuban Krasnodar – 2012–2014
 Javi García – FC Zenit St. Petersburg – 2014–2017
 Jordi – FC Rubin Kazan – 2010
 José Manuel Jurado – FC Spartak Moscow – 2012–2015
 Iván Marcano – FC Rubin Kazan – 2012–2013
 César Navas – FC Rubin Kazan, FC Rostov – 2009–2018
 Pablo Orbaiz – FC Rubin Kazan – 2012–2013
 Rubén Rochina – FC Rubin Kazan – 2016–2017
 Rodri – FC Spartak Moscow – 2011–2012
 Samu – FC Rubin Kazan – 2016
 Sergio Sánchez – FC Rubin Kazan – 2016–2017
 Antonio Soldevilla – FC Amkar Perm – 2007
 Jonatan Valle – FC Rubin Kazan – 2012
 Alberto Zapater – FC Lokomotiv Moscow – 2011–2013

Suriname
 Mitchell Donald – FC Mordovia Saransk – 2014–2015

Sweden
 Pontus Almqvist – FC Rostov – 2020–2022
 Marcus Berg – FC Krasnodar – 2019–2021
 Emil Bergström – FC Rubin Kazan – 2016
 Axel Björnström – FC Arsenal Tula – 2021
 Viktor Claesson – FC Krasnodar – 2017–2021
 Filip Dagerstål – FC Khimki – 2021–2022
 Rasmus Elm – PFC CSKA Moscow – 2012–2014
 Armin Gigović – FC Rostov – 2020–2022
 Pyotr Gitselov – FC Rubin Kazan, FC Rostov – 2007–2009
 Andreas Granqvist – FC Krasnodar – 2013–2018
 Oscar Hiljemark – FC Dynamo Moscow – 2019–2020
 Sebastian Holmén – FC Dynamo Moscow – 2016–2019
 Kim Källström – FC Spartak Moscow – 2012–2015
 Jordan Larsson – FC Spartak Moscow – 2019–2022
 Kristoffer Olsson – FC Krasnodar – 2019–2021
 Filip Rogić – FC Orenburg – 2019–2020
 Besard Šabović – FC Khimki – 2021–2022
 Anton Salétros – FC Rostov – 2018
 Carl Starfelt – FC Rubin Kazan – 2020–2021
 Carlos Strandberg – PFC CSKA Moscow, FC Ural Sverdlovsk Oblast – 2015–2016
 Jonas Wallerstedt – FC Torpedo-Metallurg Moscow – 2003
 Pontus Wernbloom – PFC CSKA Moscow – 2012–2018

Switzerland
 Kemal Ademi – FC Khimki – 2021–2022
 Marco Aratore – FC Ural Yekaterinburg – 2018–2020
 Eldin Jakupović – FC Lokomotiv Moscow – 2006–2007
 Darko Jevtić – FC Rubin Kazan – 2020–2021
 Vero Salatić – FC Ufa – 2017–2019
 Reto Ziegler – FC Lokomotiv Moscow – 2012
 Steven Zuber – PFC CSKA Moscow – 2013–2014

Syria
 Nihad Al Boushi – FC Krylia Sovetov Samara – 1996–1997
 Assaf Khalifa – FC Zhemchuzhina Sochi – 1994, 1998
 Anas Makhlouf – FC Krylia Sovetov Samara, FC Shinnik Yaroslavl – 1996–1999

Tajikistan
 Aliyor Ashurmamadov – FC Lokomotiv Moscow – 1993
 Arsen Avakov – FC Torpedo Moscow, FC Shinnik Yaroslavl, FC Lokomotiv Nizhny Novgorod, FC Uralan Elista – 1996–2000, 2002
 Yuri Baturenko – FC Lokomotiv Moscow, FC Tyumen – 1992–1995, 1997
 Igor Cherevchenko – FC Lokomotiv Moscow, FC Torpedo Moscow, FC Alania Vladikavkaz – 1996–2002
 Alisher Dzhalilov – FC Rubin Kazan – 2011–2013, 2016
 Khakim Fuzaylov – FC Lokomotiv Moscow – 1992–1994
 Rakhmatullo Fuzaylov – FC Shinnik Yaroslavl, FC Alania Vladikavkaz – 2002–2005
 Nail Galimov – FC Luch Vladivostok – 1993
 Valeriy Gorbach – FC Fakel Voronezh – 1992
 Rustam Khaidaraliyev – FC Lokomotiv Nizhny Novgorod – 1996
 Andrei Manannikov – FC Zenit St. Petersburg, FC Rotor Volgograd – 1992–1993
 Vazgen Manasyan – FC Zenit St. Petersburg – 1992
 Vitaliy Parakhnevych – FC Lokomotiv Moscow – 1995
 Vasili Postnov – FC Lokomotiv Moscow – 1992
 Alimzhon Rafikov – FC Zenit St. Petersburg, FC KAMAZ Naberezhnye Chelny – 1992–1995
 Rashid Rakhimov – FC Spartak Moscow, FC Lokomotiv Moscow – 1992–1994
 Oleg Shirinbekov – FC Torpedo Moscow – 1994–1995
 Georgi Takhokhov – FC Spartak Vladikavkaz – 1992
 Farkhod Vasiyev – FC Saturn Moscow Oblast, FC Krylia Sovetov Samara, FC Orenburg, FC Tambov – 2009–2010, 2016, 2021
 Anatoli Volovodenko – FC Uralmash Yekaterinburg – 1992–1994

Togo
 Arafat Djako – FC Anzhi Makhachkala – 2011
 Abdoul-Gafar Mamah – FC Alania Vladikavkaz – 2010

Trinidad and Tobago
 Sheldon Bateau – FC Krylia Sovetov Samara – 2015–2017

Tunisia
 Selim Benachour – FC Rubin Kazan – 2006–2007
 Anis Boussaïdi – FC Rostov – 2011
 Montassar Talbi – FC Rubin Kazan – 2021–2022
 Chaker Zouaghi – FC Lokomotiv Moscow – 2006–2007

Turkey
 Mehmet Aksu – FC Rostov – 2003
 Caner Erkin – PFC CSKA Moscow – 2007–2009
 Hasan Kabze – FC Rubin Kazan – 2007–2010
 Gökdeniz Karadeniz – FC Rubin Kazan – 2008–2018
 Fatih Tekke – FC Zenit St. Petersburg, FC Rubin Kazan – 2006–2010
 Gökhan Töre – FC Rubin Kazan – 2012–2013
 Tamer Tuna – FC Terek Grozny – 2005
 Yusuf Yazıcı – PFC CSKA Moscow – 2022

Turkmenistan
 Wladimir Baýramow – FC Rubin Kazan, FC Khimki – 2003–2008
 Valeri Broshin – PFC CSKA Moscow – 1993–1994
 Pavel Harçik – FC Rubin Kazan – 2003, 2005–2007
 Maksim Kazankov – FC SKA-Khabarovsk – 2017–2018
 Dmitri Khomukha – FC Zenit St. Petersburg, PFC CSKA Moscow, FC Shinnik Yaroslavl, FC Terek Grozny – 1996–2000, 2002–2003, 2005
 Vladimir Kostyuk – FC Dynamo Moscow – 1992–1993
 Andrei Martynov – FC Torpedo Moscow, FC Shinnik Yaroslavl – 1992, 1997
 Çaryýar Muhadow – FC Lada Togliatti – 1996
 Dmitriý Neželew – FC Uralmash Yekaterinburg, FC Zenit St. Petersburg – 1992–1994, 1996
 Denis Peremenin – FC Anzhi Makhachkala – 2000–2002
 Wahyt Orazsähedow – FC Rubin Kazan – 2011
 Andrei Zavyalov – FC KamAZ-Chally Naberezhnye Chelny – 1995

Ukraine
 Andrey Aleksanenkov – FC KamAZ-Chally Naberezhnye Chelny – 1995–1996
 Akhmed Alibekov – FC Ufa – 2020
 Oleksandr Aliyev – FC Lokomotiv Moscow, FC Anzhi Makhachkala – 2010, 2014
 Vadym Alpatov – FC Lokomotiv Nizhny Novgorod – 2000
 Oleksiy Antyukhin – FC Chernomorets Novorossiysk – 2003
 Andriy Anishchenko – FC Krylia Sovetov Samara – 1995–1996
 Oleksandr Babiy – FC Zenit St. Petersburg – 1998–1999
 Oleksandr Babych – FC Anzhi Makhachkala – 2002
 Aleksei Bakharev – FC Lada Togliatti, FC Spartak Moscow, FC Rotor Volgograd – 1994, 1996–1998
 Vitaliy Balashov – FC Tambov – 2020
 Vitaliy Balytskyi – FC Alania Vladikavkaz – 2002
 Serhiy Bezhenar – FC Chernomorets Novorossiysk – 2001
 Anatoliy Bezsmertnyi – FC Tyumen, FC Rostselmash Rostov-on-Don – 1994–1995, 1997–2001
 Maksym Biletskyi – PFC CSKA Moscow, FC Moscow, FC Rostov – 2000–2006
 Dmytro Bilonoh – FC Ural Sverdlovsk Oblast – 2015
 Illya Blyznyuk – FC Rostov, FC Spartak-Alania Vladikavkaz, FC Tom Tomsk, FC Shinnik Yaroslavl – 2000–2007
 Serhiy Borysenko – FC Alania Vladikavkaz – 2000
 Serhiy Boyko – FC Terek Grozny – 2005
 Viktor Brovchenko – FC Lokomotiv Nizhny Novgorod – 2000
 Pylyp Budkivskyi – FC Anzhi Makhachkala – 2016–2018
 Bohdan Butko – FC Amkar Perm – 2015–2016
 Ihor Chaykovskyi – FC Anzhi Makhachkala – 2017–2018
 Oleh Danchenko – FC Anzhi Makhachkala, FC Yenisey Krasnoyarsk, FC Rubin Kazan, FC Ufa – 2017–2020
 Serhiy Datsenko – FC Rostov, FC Terek Grozny – 2000–2005
 Denys Dedechko – FC Amkar Perm, FC SKA-Khabarovsk – 2010, 2017
 Marko Dević – FC Rubin Kazan, FC Rostov – 2014–2017
 Anatoliy Didenko – FC Amkar Perm – 2004–2005
 Serhiy Dmytriyev – FC Anzhi Makhachkala – 2001–2002
 Yuriy Dmytrulin – FC Shinnik Yaroslavl – 2006
 Serhiy Doronchenko – FC Lada Togliatti – 1994
 Yevhen Drahunov – FC Lada Togliatti – 1994
 Ihor Dudnyk – FC Terek Grozny – 2008
 Yuriy Dudnyk – PFC CSKA Moscow, FC Rostselmash Rostov-on-Don – 1993, 1997–1998
 Vladislav Duyun – FC Spartak Moscow, FC Lokomotiv Nizhny Novgorod, FC Rostselmash Rostov-on-Don, FC Sokol Saratov – 1996–2002
 Andriy Dykan – FC Terek Grozny, FC Spartak Moscow, FC Krasnodar – 2009–2015
 Kostyantyn Dymarchuk – FC Zenit St. Petersburg, FC Tyumen, FC Zhemchuzhina Sochi – 1997–1999
 Vitaliy Fedoriv – FC Amkar Perm – 2008–2011
 Vitaliy Fedotov – FC SKA-Khabarovsk – 2017–2018
 Dmitry Gorbushin – FC Kuban Krasnodar – 2009
 Volodymyr Hapon – FC Uralan Elista – 2003
 Oleh Haras – FC Lokomotiv Moscow, FC Fakel Voronezh – 1996, 1998, 2000–2001
 Serhiy Harashchenkov – FC Amkar Perm – 2012
 Volodymyr Herashchenko – FC Rotor Volgograd – 1992–1998
 Oleksiy Hetman – FC Rostselmash Rostov-on-Don – 2001
 Ivan Hetsko – FC Lokomotiv Nizhny Novgorod, FC Alania Vladikavkaz – 1995–1997
 Yaroslav Hodzyur – FC Terek Grozny, FC Ural Yekaterinburg – 2008, 2010–2021
 Dmytro Horbatenko – FC KamAZ Naberezhnye Chelny – 1994–1995
 Valeriy Horodov – FC Uralmash Yekaterinburg, FC Fakel Voronezh – 1994–1995, 1997
 Oleksandr Horshkov – FC Zhemchuzhina Sochi, FC Zenit St. Petersburg, FC Saturn-RenTV Ramenskoye – 1996–2007
 Oleksandr Hranovskyi – FC Spartak Moscow – 2001
 Yuriy Hritsyna – FC Dynamo-Gazovik Tyumen – 1994–1995
 Artem Hromov – FC Krylia Sovetov Samara – 2017
 Dmytro Hryshko – FC SKA-Khabarovsk – 2017–2018
 Yuriy Hulyayev – FC Lokomotiv Nizhny Novgorod – 1992, 1993
 Yuriy Hudymenko – FC Dynamo Moscow, FC Lada Togliatti – 1993–1994
 Oleksandr Humenyuk – FC Chernomorets Novorossiysk – 1998
 Andriy Husin – FC Krylia Sovetov Samara, FC Saturn Ramenskoye – 2005–2006, 2008
 Andriy Huzenko – FC Krylia Sovetov Samara – 1998
 Dmytro Ivanisenya – PFC Krylia Sovetov Samara – 2021–2022
 Yuriy Kalitvintsev – FC Dynamo Moscow, FC Lokomotiv Nizhny Novgorod – 1992–1994
 Maksym Kalynychenko – FC Spartak Moscow – 2000–2008
 Oleksandr Kapliyenko – FC Tambov – 2020
 Oleh Kastornyi – FC Baltika Kaliningrad, FC Fakel Voronezh – 1998, 2000–2001
 Oleksandr Kasyan – FC Tom Tomsk – 2016
 Oleksiy Khramtsov – FC Uralan Elista – 2000
 Vyacheslav Khruslov – FC Dynamo-Gazovik Tyumen – 1994–1995
 Ihor Khudobyak – FC Rostov – 2013–2014
 Sergei Kormiltsev – FC Uralan Elista, FC Torpedo Moscow – 1998, 2000–2006
 Ihor Korniyets – FC Rotor Volgograd – 1995–1997
 Ihor Korol – FC Baltika Kaliningrad – 1998
 Oleh Koshelyuk – FC Torpedo-Luzhniki Moscow – 1997
 Ihor Kostyuk – FC Tyumen – 1997
 Pavlo Kotovenko – FC Rotor Volgograd – 2001–2004
 Oleksandr Koval – FC Sokol Saratov – 2001
 Kyrylo Kovalchuk – FC Tom Tomsk – 2009–2011, 2016
 Serhiy Krukovets – FC Torpedo Moscow, FC Lokomotiv Nizhny Novgorod – 1996–2000
 Denys Kulakov – FC Ural Sverdlovsk Oblast – 2015–2023
 Kostyantyn Kulyk – FC Rotor Volgograd – 1995
 Ihor Kutyepov – FC Dynamo-Gazovik Tyumen, PFC CSKA Moscow, FC Rostselmash Rostov-on-Don – 1994–1995, 1997–2000
 Serhiy Kuznetsov – FC KamAZ Naberezhnye Chelny – 1994
 Serhiy Kuznetsov – FC Alania Vladikavkaz – 2010
 Oleh Kyrylov – FC Asmaral Moscow – 1993
 Oleksandr Kyryukhin – FC Krylia Sovetov Samara, FC Chernomorets Novorossiysk – 2000–2001
 Ihor Lahoyda – FC Uralan Elista – 1999
 Oleksandr Lavrentsov – FC Krylia Sovetov Samara, FC Torpedo-Metallurg Moscow – 2000–2003
 Viktor Leonenko – FC Dynamo Moscow – 1992
 Yevhen Levchenko – FC Saturn Moscow Oblast – 2009
 Maksym Levytskyi – FC Chernomorets Novorossiysk, FC Spartak Moscow, FC Dynamo Moscow – 1999–2005
 Volodymyr Lobas – FC Zhemchuzhina Sochi, FC Energiya-Tekstilshchik Kamyshin – 1996
 Andriy Lopushynskyi – FC Fakel Voronezh – 1997
 Yehor Luhachov – FC Spartak Moscow – 2008
 Taras Lutsenko – FC Uralan Elista – 1999–2000
 Yevhen Lutsenko – FC Dynamo Moscow, FC Shinnik Yaroslavl – 2003–2004
 Yevhen Lysytsyn – FC Spartak Moscow – 2001
 Yuriy Maksymov – FC Rostov – 2003
 Roman Maksymyuk – FC Zenit St. Petersburg – 1998–1999
 Aleksandr Malygin – FC Rostselmash Rostov-on-Don – 2000–2002
 Mark Mampassi – FC Lokomotiv Moscow – 2022
 Oleksandr Martsun – FC Baltika Kaliningrad – 1998
 Volodymyr Matsyhura – FC Rostselmash Rostov-on-Don – 1996–2000
 Vasyl Mazur – FC Krylia Sovetov Samara, FC Lokomotiv Nizhny Novgorod – 1996–1998, 2000
 Roman Meleshko – FC Spartak Vladikavkaz – 1993
 Ilya Mikhalyov – FC Amkar Perm – 2011
 Oleh Mishchenko – FC Amkar Perm – 2016
 Oleksandr Mitrofanov – FC Anzhi Makhachkala – 2002
 Oleh Mochulyak – FC Uralmash Yekaterinburg – 1996
 Ihor Moiseyev – FC Asmaral Moscow – 1993
 Yuriy Mokrytskyi – FC Zhemchuzhina Sochi – 1997
 Anton Monakhov – FC Uralan Elista – 2002–2003
 Roman Monaryov – FC Alania Vladikavkaz, PFC CSKA Moscow, FC Torpedo-Metallurg Moscow, FC Luch-Energiya Vladivostok, FC Shinnik Yaroslavl – 1998, 2001–2003, 2006, 2008
 Yuriy Moroz – FC Alania Vladikavkaz, FC Torpedo-ZIL Moscow – 1997–1998, 2001
 Ruslan Mostovyi – PFC Spartak Nalchik, FC Tom Tomsk – 2006–2007
 Asan Mustafayev – FC Uralmash Yekaterinburg – 1995
 Taras Mykhalyk – FC Lokomotiv Moscow – 2013–2018
 Volodymyr Mykytyn – FC Rostov – 2001–2003
 Oleh Naduda – FC Spartak Moscow – 1994
 Serhiy Nahornyak – FC Spartak Moscow – 1995–1996
 Oleksandr Nefyodov – FC Uralmash Yekaterinburg – 1995
 Oleksandr Nikiforov – FC KamAZ Naberezhnye Chelny – 1993–1994
 Denys Onyshchenko – FC Tom Tomsk – 2006
 Viktor Oparenyuk – FC Zhemchuzhina Sochi – 1995
 Anatoliy Oprya – FC Zhemchuzhina Sochi – 1999
 Hennadiy Orbu – FC Rotor Volgograd, FC Sokol Saratov – 1996, 2001–2002
 Ivan Ordets – FC Dynamo Moscow – 2019–2021
 Oleksiy Osipov – FC Krylia Sovetov Samara, FC Chernomorets Novorossiysk – 2000–2001
 Oleh Ostapenko – FC Fakel Voronezh – 2001
 Dmytro Parfenov – FC Spartak Moscow, FC Dynamo Moscow, FC Khimki, FC Saturn Moscow Oblast – 1998–2007, 2009–2010
 Oleh Patyak – PFC Spartak Nalchik – 2008
 Hennadiy Perepadenko – FC Spartak Moscow – 1992
 Serhiy Perepadenko – FC Lokomotiv Moscow – 1994–1995
 Serhiy Perkhun – PFC CSKA Moscow – 2001
 Oleh Pestryakov – PFC CSKA Moscow, FC Rostselmash Rostov-on-Don, FC Spartak Moscow – 1996–1999, 2003
 Eduard Piskun – FC KamAZ Naberezhnye Chelny – 1994
 Serhiy Pohodin – FC Spartak Moscow – 1993–1994
 Artem Polyarus – FC Khimki, FC Akhmat Grozny – 2020–2021
 Oleksandr Pomazun – FC Spartak Moscow, FC Baltika Kaliningrad, FC Torpedo-ZIL Moscow, FC Saturn-RenTV Ramenskoye – 1993, 1996–1998, 2001–2002
 Vitaliy Ponomarenko – FC Dynamo-Gazovik Tyumen – 1995
 Serhiy Popov – FC Zenit St. Petersburg – 1996–1997
 Hennadiy Popovych – FC Zenit St. Petersburg – 1997–2001
 Andriy Poroshyn – PFC Spartak Nalchik – 2006
 Oleksiy Prokhorenkov – FC Dynamo Moscow – 1998 
 Volodymyr Pryyomov – FC Krylia Sovetov Samara – 2011–2012
 Andriy Proshyn – FC Tom Tomsk, FC Rostov – 2006–2007, 2010–2011
 Vyacheslav Protsenko – FC Zhemchuzhina Sochi – 1993–1995
 Vladyslav Prudius – FC Rostselmash Rostov-on-Don, FC Anzhi Makhachkala – 1996–2002
 Oleksandr Pryzetko – FC Tyumen, FC Torpedo Moscow, FC Chernomorets Novorossiysk – 1995, 1997–1998, 2000–2001, 2003
 Serhiy Puchkov – FC KamAZ Naberezhnye Chelny – 1994
 Vitaliy Pushkutsa – FC Chernomorets Novorossiysk – 2000–2001
 Andriy Pylyavskyi – FC Rubin Kazan – 2016
 Serhiy Pylypchuk – PFC Spartak Nalchik, FC Khimki – 2006–2009, 2011
 Yaroslav Rakitskyi – FC Zenit Saint Petersburg – 2019–2021
 Serhii Rebrov – FC Rubin Kazan – 2008–2009
 Oleksandr Rolevych – FC Baltika Kaliningrad – 1996
 Vitaliy Rozghon – FC Krylia Sovetov Samara – 1999
 Petro Rusak – FC Chernomorets Novorossiysk – 1996–1997
 Roman Rusanovskyi – FC Chernomorets Novorossiysk – 1996–1998
 Oleh Rypan – FC Rostselmash Rostov-on-Don – 1996–1997
 Yuriy Sak – FC Spartak Moscow, FC Krylia Sovetov Samara – 1994, 1999
 Viktor Sakhno – FC KamAZ Naberezhnye Chelny – 1993
 Vitaliy Samoylov – FC Sokol Saratov, FC Rotor Volgograd – 2001–2002, 2004
 Oleh Samsonenko – FC Uralmash Yekaterinburg – 1992–1993
 Andriy Sapuha – FC Torpedo Moscow, FC Lokomotiv Nizhny Novgorod – 1998–2000
 Volodymyr Savchenko – FC Rostov, FC Terek Grozny – 1997–2003, 2005
 Serhiy Seleznyov – FC Torpedo-ZIL Moscow – 2001
 Yevhen Seleznyov – FC Kuban Krasnodar – 2016
 Yuriy Seleznyov – FC Rostselmash Rostov-on-Don – 2000–2001
 Dmytro Semochko – FC Uralan Elista, FC Luch-Energiya Vladivostok, FC Shinnik Yaroslavl, FC Khimki – 2000, 2002–2003, 2006–2009
 Serhiy Serebrennikov – FC Shinnik Yaroslavl – 1998
 Oleksandr Sevidov – FC Torpedo Moscow – 1993
 Dmytro Shcherbak – FC Anzhi Makhachkala – 2016
 Bohdan Shershun – PFC CSKA Moscow – 2002–2005
 Vyacheslav Shevchenko – FC Torpedo-Metallurg Moscow – 2003
 Vyacheslav Shevchuk – FC Shinnik Yaroslavl – 2002–2004
 Pavlo Shkapenko – FC Uralan Elista, FC Torpedo Moscow – 1999–2001
 Serhiy Shmatovalenko – FC Krylia Sovetov Samara – 1999
 Serhiy Shubin – FC Zhemchuzhina Sochi – 1996–1997
 Ihor Shukhovtsev – FC Uralmash Yekaterinburg – 1996
 Vitaliy Shumeyko – PFC Spartak Nalchik – 2007–2008
 Oleksandr Shutov – FC Rostselmash Rostov-on-Don, PFC CSKA Moscow, FC Chernomorets Novorossiysk, FC Amkar Perm – 1995–1999, 2004–2005
 Anton Shynder – FC Amkar Perm – 2016–2017
 Serhiy Shyshchenko – FC Baltika Kaliningrad – 1998
 Andriy Sidelnikov – PFC CSKA Moscow – 1997
 Serhiy Skachenko – FC Torpedo Moscow – 1992–1993, 1998–1999
 Denys Skepskyi – FC Dynamo Moscow – 2006, 2009
 Vitaliy Skysh – FC Alania Vladikavkaz – 1996
 Miro Slavov – FC Anzhi Makhachkala – 2011
 Valentyn Slyusar – FC Rostselmash Rostov-on-Don – 1999
 Serhiy Snytko – FC Shinnik Yaroslavl, FC Chernomorets Novorossiysk, FC Kuban Krasnodar – 1997–2001, 2003–2004
 Oleg Solovyov – FC Lada Togliatti, FC Tekstilshchik Kamyshin, FC Chernomorets Novorossiysk, FC Saturn Ramenskoye, FC Uralan Elista – 1994–1997, 1999–2000, 2002
 Yevhen Sonin – FC Krylia Sovetov Samara – 1994–1995
 Oleksandr Spivak – FC Zenit St. Petersburg – 2000–2006
 Mykhaylo Starostyak – FC Shinnik Yaroslavl – 2004–2005
 Pavlo Stepanets – FC Mordovia Saransk, FC Ufa – 2012–2015
 Oleksandr Stepanov – FC Spartak-Alania Vladikavkaz – 2003
 Vasyl Storchak – FC Asmaral Moscow – 1992–1993
 Serhiy Surelo – FC Dynamo-Gazovik Tyumen – 1992
 Hennadiy Sushko – FC Zhemchuzhina Sochi – 1998
 Vyacheslav Sviderskyi – FC Alania Vladikavkaz, FC Dynamo Moscow, FC Saturn Ramenskoye – 2002–2005
 Oleksandr Svystunov – FC Zenit St. Petersburg, FC Chernomorets Novorossiysk – 1997, 2000–2001
 Serhiy Symonenko – FC Torpedo Moscow, FC Alania Vladikavkaz – 1999, 2001–2002
 Oleh Tereshchenko – FC Tekstilshchik Kamyshin, FC Uralan Elista, FC Sokol Saratov, FC Fakel Voronezh – 1993, 1998–2001
 Maksim Tishchenko – FC Rotor Volgograd – 1996–2000
 Maksym Trusevych – FC Rostov – 2007
 Mykola Tsygan – FC Alania Vladikavkaz, FC Krylia Sovetov Samara – 2005, 2010
 Eduard Tsykhmeystruk – FC Spartak Moscow – 2001–2002
 Dmytro Tutychenko – FC Uralan Elista – 1999–2000
 Dmytro Tyapushkin – FC Spartak Moscow, PFC CSKA Moscow, FC Dynamo Moscow – 1994–1998
 Anatoliy Tymoshchuk – FC Zenit St. Petersburg – 2007–2009, 2013–2015
 Vladyslav Vashchuk – FC Spartak Moscow – 2003
 Andriy Vasylytchuk – FC Zhemchuzhina Sochi, FC Energiya-Tekstilshchik Kamyshin – 1996
 Yuriy Vernydub – FC Zenit St. Petersburg – 1997–1999
 Kostyantyn Vizyonok – FC Baltika Kaliningrad – 1998
 Oleh Volotyok – FC Asmaral Moscow – 1993
 Valeriy Vorobyov – FC Torpedo Moscow – 1997–2003
 Andriy Voronin – FC Dynamo Moscow – 2010–2014
 Viktor Yablonskyi – FC Baltika Kaliningrad – 1996–1998
 Dmytro Yakovenko – PFC CSKA Moscow – 1997
 Serhiy Yakovenko – FC Zhemchuzhina Sochi, FC Fakel Voronezh – 1993, 2000
 Ivan Yaremchuk – FC KamAZ Naberezhnye Chelny, FC Energiya-Tekstilshchik Kamyshin – 1994, 1996
 Serhiy Yarmolych – FC Chernomorets Novorossiysk – 1995
 Kostyantyn Yaroshenko – FC Ural Sverdlovsk Oblast – 2014–2016
 Artem Yashkin – FC Shinnik Yaroslavl, FC Uralan Elista – 1992, 1998, 2002
 Yuriy Yaskov – FC Zenit St. Petersburg – 2000
 Bohdan Yesyp – FC Rostselmash Rostov-on-Don – 1999
 Vasyl Yevseyev – FC Tekstilshchik Kamyshin – 1993
 Andriy Yudin – FC Tekstilshchik Kamyshin, FC Fakel Voronezh – 1993–1994, 1997
 Vyacheslav Zapoyaska – FC Sokol Saratov – 2002
 Artem Zasyadvovk – FC Shinnik Yaroslavl – 2005–2006
 Volodymyr Zayarnyi – FC KamAZ-Chally Naberezhnye Chelny, FC Chernomorets Novorossiysk – 1996–1997, 1999–2001
 Serhiy Zayets – FC Uralmash Yekaterinburg – 1994–1995
 Ihor Zhabchenko – FC Rotor Volgograd – 1996
 Ihor Zhurakhovskyi – FC Kuban Krasnodar – 2016
 Hennadiy Zhylkin – FC Chernomorets Novorossiysk – 1995
 Oleksandr Zinchenko – FC Ufa – 2015–2016
 Vladyslav Zubkov – FC KamAZ Naberezhnye Chelny, FC Lokomotiv Nizhny Novgorod – 1993–1997

United States
 Eugene Starikov – FC Tom Tomsk, FC Rostov – 2010–2013

Uruguay
 Luis Aguiar – FC Dynamo Moscow – 2009
 Gonzalo Bueno – FC Kuban Krasnodar – 2013
 Guillermo Cotugno – FC Rubin Kazan – 2015–2016
 Javier Delgado – FC Saturn Ramenskoye – 2004–2005
 Carlos Gutiérrez – FC Rostov – 2004–2006
 Abel Hernández – PFC CSKA Moscow – 2018–2019
 Diego Laxalt – FC Dynamo Moscow – 2021–2022
 Mauricio Lemos – FC Rubin Kazan – 2015
 Víctor López – FC Uralan Elista – 2003
 Javier Mancini – FC Rostov – 2005
 Nicolás Marichal – FC Dynamo Moscow – 2022–2023
 Sebastián Morquio – FC Uralan Elista – 2003
 Omar Pérez – FC Rostov – 2004–2006
 Mauricio Pereyra – FC Krasnodar – 2013–2019
 Facundo Píriz – FC Terek Grozny – 2013–2017
 Agustín Rogel – FC Krylia Sovetov Samara – 2018–2019
 Andrés Scotti – FC Rubin Kazan – 2003–2006
 Bruno Silva – FC Rostov – 2004
 Marcelo Sosa – FC Spartak Moscow – 2004
 Cristian Tassano – FC Khimki – 2023
 Guillermo Varela – FC Dynamo Moscow – 2020–2022

Uzbekistan
 Vadim Afonin – FC Orenburg, FC Anzhi Makhachkala – 2016–2019
 Ruslan Agalarov – FC Anzhi Makhachkala – 2000–2002
 Odil Ahmedov – FC Anzhi Makhachkala, FC Krasnodar – 2011–2016
 Andrey Akopyants – FC Rostov – 2000–2005
 Sergey Andreyev – FC Krylia Sovetov Samara – 1998
 Bakhtiyor Ashurmatov – FC Spartak-Alania Vladikavkaz, FC Torpedo-Metallurg Moscow, FC Krylia Sovetov Samara – 2003, 2005
 Ulugbek Bakayev – PFC CSKA Moscow, FC Torpedo-ZIL Moscow – 2001–2002
 Marat Bikmaev – FC Krylia Sovetov Samara, PFC Spartak Nalchik, FC Alania Vladikavkaz – 2005, 2008–2010
 Pavel Bugalo – FC Alania Vladikavkaz – 2000
 Gennadi Denisov – FC Spartak Vladikavkaz – 1992–1994
 Vitaliy Denisov – FC Lokomotiv Moscow, FC Krylia Sovetov Samara, FC Rubin Kazan – 2013–2019
 Khojimat Erkinov – FC Torpedo Moscow – 2022
 Davron Fayziev – PFC CSKA Moscow, FC Alania Vladikavkaz – 2000–2002
 Andrei Fyodorov – FC Alania Vladikavkaz, FC Rubin Kazan – 1998–1999, 2003–2008
 Vagiz Galiulin – FC Rubin Kazan, FC Sibir Novosibirsk, FC Ufa, FC Tosno – 2008, 2010, 2014–2015, 2017–2018
 Alexander Geynrikh – PFC CSKA Moscow, FC Torpedo Moscow – 2003, 2005–2006
 Jafar Irismetov – FC Chernomorets Novorossiysk, FC Spartak Moscow, FC Anzhi Makhachkala – 1998, 2001–2002
 Victor Karpenko – FC Shinnik Yaroslavl – 2003–2004
 Dostonbek Khamdamov – FC Anzhi Makhachkala – 2018
 Igor Kichigin – FC Fakel Voronezh – 1992
 Leonid Koshelev – FC Shinnik Yaroslavl – 2005–2006
 Yaroslav Krushelnitskiy – FC Rotor Volgograd – 2004
 Sergey Lebedev – FC Shinnik Yaroslavl – 1999
 Sergey Lushan – FC Krylia Sovetov Samara, FC Rostselmash Rostov-on-Don – 1997–2003
 Vladimir Maminov – FC Lokomotiv Moscow – 1993–2008
 Davron Mirzaev – FC Rubin Kazan – 2009
 Eduard Momotov – FC Chernomorets Novorossiysk – 1998–1999
 Bahodir Nasimov – FC Rubin Kazan – 2010
 Aleksey Nikolaev – FC Shinnik Yaroslavl – 2006
 Oleg Pashinin – FC Lokomotiv Moscow – 1993–2007
 Aleksey Polyakov – FC Lokomotiv Moscow, FC Krylia Sovetov Samara, FC Luch-Energiya Vladivostok, FC Tom Tomsk – 1999, 2001–2010
 Mirjalol Qosimov – FC Alania Vladikavkaz, FC Krylia Sovetov Samara – 1992, 1994–1996, 1999–2001, 2003–2004
 Vladimir Radkevich – FC Rotor Volgograd – 2002–2004
 Bakhodyr Rakhmanov – FC Okean Nakhodka – 1993
 Andrey Rezantsev – FC Okean Nakhodka, FC Krylia Sovetov Samara, FC Shinnik Yaroslavl – 1993–1999
 Yevgeni Safonov – FC Shinnik Yaroslavl – 2002–2006
 Aleksandr Sayun – FC Torpedo Moscow, FC Uralan Elista, FC Lokomotiv Nizhny Novgorod – 1998–2000
 Nikolay Shirshov – FC Rostov – 2002–2005
 Igor Shkvyrin – FC Alania Vladikavkaz – 1992
 Eldor Shomurodov – FC Rostov – 2017–2020
 Gennadi Skripnik – FC Dynamo Stavropol – 1992
 Pavel Solomin – FC Saturn Moscow Oblast – 2007
 Sanzhar Tursunov – FC Volga Nizhny Novgorod, FC Alania Vladikavkaz – 2011–2012
 Oston Urunov – FC Ufa, FC Spartak Moscow, FC Ural Yekaterinburg – 2020–2022
 Igor Volkov – FC Torpedo Moscow – 1994–1996
 Ibrokhimkhalil Yuldoshev – FC Pari Nizhny Novgorod – 2021–2023

Venezuela
 Wilker Ángel – FC Terek Grozny – 2016–2021
 Jhon Chancellor – FC Anzhi Makhachkala – 2018
 Leopoldo Jiménez – FC Alania Vladikavkaz – 2005
 Fernando Martínez – FC Uralan Elista – 2003
 Yordan Osorio – FC Zenit St. Petersburg – 2019–2020
 Andrés Ponce – FC Anzhi Makhachkala, FC Akhmat Grozny, FC Rotor Volgograd – 2018–2021
 Salomón Rondón – FC Rubin Kazan, FC Zenit St. Petersburg, PFC CSKA Moscow – 2012–2015, 2021

Zambia
 Lameck Banda – FC Arsenal Tula – 2019–2020
 Gift Kampamba – FC Rostov – 2002–2004
 Evans Kangwa – FC Arsenal Tula – 2017–2022
 Kings Kangwa – FC Arsenal Tula – 2019–2022
 Chisamba Lungu – FC Ural Sverdlovsk Oblast – 2013–2017
 Chaswe Nsofwa – FC Krylia Sovetov Samara – 2003
 Stoppila Sunzu – FC Arsenal Tula – 2017–2018

Zimbabwe
 Newton Ben Katanha – PFC Spartak Nalchik – 2006
 Musawengosi Mguni – FC Terek Grozny – 2011

Notes

Russian Premier League
Russian Premier League players
Expatriate footballers in Russia
Association football player non-biographical articles